= String Quartet No. 4 (Schoenberg) =

1936 musical work by Arnold Schoenberg

- String quartet by Arnold Schoenberg
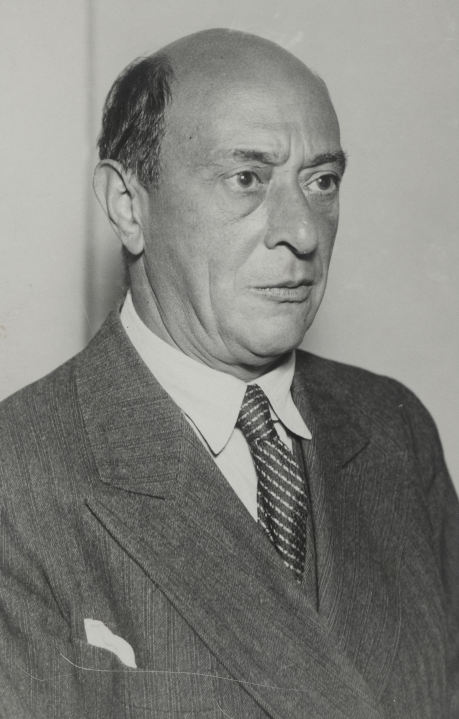
- Schoenberg (c. 1930, Max Fenichel)
- Opus: 37
- Period: 20th-century music
- Composed: 1936
- Dedication: Elizabeth Sprague Coolidge and the Kolisch Quartet
- Movements: 4

Premiere
- Date: 1937
- Location: Los Angeles
- Performers: Kolisch Quartet

String Quartet No. 4, Op. 37, is the string quartet composed by Arnold Schoenberg from April to June in 1936. It has four movements linked by motives and was written using twelve-tone technique. The Kolisch Quartet premiered the work in Los Angeles in 1937.

== Background ==
Schoenberg's String Quartet No. 4, Op. 37, written from April to June in 1936 and commissioned by Elizabeth Sprague Coolidge, marks the transition to his late style. It is freer than his String Quartet No. 3, and he called it "much more pleasant". He had recently relocated to Brentwood, Los Angeles to teach at the University of California, Los Angeles, and was revisiting tonal idioms while still working on the opera Moses und Aron (planned since 1923).

Schoenberg had last finished Three Songs, Op. 48 (Berlin, 1933) and begun the Violin Concerto (United States, 1934–36). After sketches, he wrote the Quartet in six weeks for $1,000, finishing the Concerto midway. The Concerto's first movement culminates in a structurally integrating passage like many in the more cohesive Quartet. He did not finish another twelve-tone work until the Ode to Napoleon (1942).

== Overview ==
The Quartet has four motivically linked movements:

1. Allegro molto, energico
2. Comodo
3. Largo
4. Allegro – agitato

They have the same twelve-tone row.

== I. Allegro molto, energico ==
The first movement, marked Allegro molto, energico (lit. 'Very fast, energetic'), is a march by turns calm and agitated. An abstract sonata form veiled by extensive thematic variation, Schoenberg wrote that it "resembles catalogued forms in only a few respects". Its musical argument is audible as two head-motives, <2,1,9> and <7,8,0>, that accrue different structural associations, including

- row forms (source row forms P_{2} and I_{7}),
- meters (broadly quadruple and triple),
- textures (generally thicker and thinner), and
- tonalities (pointedly D minor and its submediant, B♭ major).

This exemplifies Schoenberg's "musical idea" (Idee or musikalische Gedanke), or "the totality ... its creator wanted to present", which is somewhat analogous to the Schenkerian Ursatz, only more dynamic. (Note: Expressive content or meaning may be included on some readings.) As a process, narrative, or dialectic, the idea is embodied as the Grundgestalt (initial thesis). This basic shape generates tensions (some antithesis) during composition, which decisions reinforcing structural coherence may (Note: Moses und Aron dramatizes tension between Word and image, ending with the ineffability of God (Schoenberg did not compose past Moses's cry, "O Word, thou Word, that I lack!").) mediate between or resolve through a process analogous to synthesis, aiming for some unity of opposites or a sense of organic unity. (Note: In German philosophy, particularly German idealism, and in music criticism since Eduard Hanslick, music is sometimes understood as an ineffable, coherent whole in which form and content are mediated, as in the dichotomy between absolute music and program music, among other dualisms. To clarify this context, musicologist Jack Boss rearticulates and expands Schoenberg's reaction to Rudolf Kolisch's labeling the Third Quartet's row forms: SCHOENBERG'S REPLY But do you think one's any better off for knowing it? The only ... analysis ... for me is one that throws the idea into relief and shows how it is presented and worked out. SCHOENBERG'S REPLY, REARTICULATED AND EXPANDED Don't just count the rows!! ... You know ... that a piece ... tonal or "atonal" or twelve-tone ... flow[s] out of its initial material [and] picks up conflicts or problems inherent in that Grundgestalt or between it and other elements, elaborates and intensifies them, and then solves them [for] the end, showing how what ... seemed foreign is ... connected [...]. For more than 200 years, German-speaking musicians and thinkers have understood music, art, and life in general in ways like this, from ... rhetoricians and the Idealist philosophers to [Adolf Bernhard] Marx and Hanslick, and I am certainly no exception. ... [T]ell me ... how the musical idea is presented.)

=== Exposition ===
==== Primary theme ====
The periodic Grundgestalt melody is shaped from P_{2}, with trichords <2,1,9>, <10,5,3>, <4,0,8>, and <7,6,11>. Its first five pitches outline D minor crossing into B♭ major (solfège: do–ti–sol/ti–do–sol). Accompanying aggregate-completing trichord groups project 4/4, a meter conflicted by the opening melody, with its irregular phrase segments. Seminal dyads <2,1> (D–C♯) and <8,7> (A♭–G) are accented. Beethoven's "fate" motif is evoked rhythmically.

As a quasi-cadence (mm. 4–5), a D-major-seventh chord (via {1,2,9}) leads into a B♭ sonority (via <10,5,3>). As if in 3/4, a pickup leads into head-motive I_{7}: <7,8,0>, presented vertically on a dotted rhythm (mm. 6–7) with ensuing B♭–oriented dominant–tonic motion (mm. 8–9). But the accompaniment restores 4/4 (mm. 10–12), and a pitch-class palindrome (mm. 13–16) suggests D–focused harmonic motion, with <9,1,2,2,1,9> in the first violin's Hauptstimme (chief melody).

In the continuation, <7,8,0> recurs in triplets across registers (mm. 21–22) and, amid B♭–oriented motion, in second violin's palindrome (<7,8,0,0,8,7>, mm. 23–24).

==== Transition ====
The transition has two portions (mm. 27–42 and 42–62) and a cadence (mm. 62b–65), with modulation-like aggregate transpositions from home-key-like A_{2} through A_{7}, A_{4}, A_{10}, and A_{6}, to dominant-like A_{9}.

In mm. 27–31, building on earlier palindromic passages, a trichord pitch-class mirror spans row forms P_{2}, I_{7}, R_{2}, and RI_{7} partitioned into hexachords in the violins, over the lower strings' complementary pitch-class retrograde. (Note: The opening bars are also hexachordal across registers.) Mosaics (order-number partitions), formed through the distribution of pitch-class sets in the violins, structure the trichord exchange relations

- P_{2}: <^{2,1}_{9}> (violins) and I_{7}: <9,1,2> (cello), and then
- I_{7}: <^{7,8}_{0}> (violins) and P_{2}: <0,8,7> (cello).

Midway, these exchange relations are paralleled in the second violin and lower strings.

In mm. 35–36, the violins' partition of P_{7} as <^{7,6,}_{2,3,}^{10,8,}¦^{9,5,}_{1,0,}^{11,4}> previews the development theme (mm. 116ff.), while the lower strings' related partition of I_{0} previews the start of the secondary theme (mm. 66–68), together prefiguring these themes' contrapuntal recapitulation (mm. 188ff.).

In mm. 42–44a, the second violin, evoking B♭: ti–do–mi (via I_{9}: <9,10,2>), introduces the transition theme, set within more trichordal mirrors that give way, in mm. 44b–47, to the opening structure of the head-motives and aggregate-completing trichord groups.

The transition's cadence has distinctive sonorities, rhythms, and textures, but its melodic tetrachords recall an earlier passage by collectional invariance:

- I_{2}: <2,3,7,6>, <11,1,0,4>, <8,9,10,5> (first violin, mm. 62b–63)
- P_{7}: <7,6,2,3>, <10,8,9,5>, <1,0,11,4> (violins, mm. 35–36)

==== Secondary theme ====
For the secondary theme (mm. 66–94), Schoenberg alludes to expository tonic–dominant modulation, including with an A minor-major seventh chord. (Note: Schoenberg similarly suggests sonata-form tonal procedures in the first movement of the Wind Quintet, Op. 26 (1923–1924).) The cello Nebenstimme, or counter-melody, reprises the seminal dyads, transposed and in continuous chromatic descent, entering with <9,8> just before the theme and continuing with <7,6> beneath it (mm. 66–68).

=== Development ===
The development (mm. 95–164) has five stages (mm. 95–104, 105–110, 111–139, 140–153, and 153–164).

=== Recapitulation and coda ===
The concise recapitulation (mm. 165–238) recasts the primary theme (mm. 165–177) and secondary theme (mm. 188–195) separated by a transition (mm. 178–188). Both themes return in counterpoint: the first with another from m. 42 (the transition), and the second with one from m. 116 (the development).

Following a transition (mm. 195–238), the coda (mm. 239–284) has two stages based on the primary theme (mm. 239–257) and the secondary theme (mm. 258–273). In the final section (mm. 274–284), melodic and tonic–dominant motion evoking B♭ major crowds out bits of D minor until both keys' tonic and dominant harmonies are fused in a quasi-cadence.

== II. Comodo ==
The second movement, marked Comodo (lit. 'Leisurely'), is an intermezzo in ternary form. It begins as a gentle waltz with an arpeggio-like theme but turns more virtuosic, playful, and edgy as the middle section introduces new material and accrues textural density through motivic–thematic development. Elements of this carry into the return before it ends abruptly as if exhausted.

== III. Largo ==
The solemn third movement, marked Largo (lit. 'Broadly', as in very slowly and expansively), is in binary form (ABAB). It opens with a unison theme in all instruments, which diverge into separate lines, and has the character of an operatic recitative. A diminuendo leads into the periodic, undulating secondary theme. The unison theme returns in inversion.

== IV. Allegro – agitato ==
The finale, marked Allegro (lit. 'Fast'), is a rondo dominated by variation. Returning to march-like material, it becomes agitated, not unlike the Violin Concerto's finale. The main theme is subsumed into extensive transformation, then gradually re-emerges, and the work ends morendo.

== Reception ==
The Kolisch Quartet premiered the Quartet in Los Angeles in 1937. Schoenberg dedicated the work to them and Coolidge.

== See also ==
- Fragmentation (music)
