= African-American music =

Musical traditions of Black African American Slaves people

African-American music is a broad term covering a diverse range of musical genres largely developed by African Americans and their culture. Its origins lie in musical forms that developed as a result of the enslavement of African Americans prior to the American Civil War. It has been said that "every genre that is born from America has black roots."

White slave owners subjugated their slaves physically, mentally, and spiritually through brutal and demeaning acts with whipping and death. Some White Americans considered African Americans separate and unequal for centuries, going to extraordinary lengths to keep them oppressed. African-American slaves created a distinctive type of music that played an important role in the era of enslavement. Slave songs, commonly known as work songs, were used to combat the hardships of the physical labor. Work songs were also used to communicate with other slaves without the slave owner hearing. The song "Wade in the Water" was sung by slaves to warn others trying to leave to use the water to obscure their trail. Following the Civil War, African Americans employed playing European music in military bands developed a new style called ragtime that gradually evolved into jazz. Jazz incorporated the sophisticated polyrhythmic structure of dance and folk music of peoples from western and Sub-Saharan Africa. These musical forms had a wide-ranging influence on the development of music within the United States and around the world during the 20th century.

Analyzing African music through the lens of European musicology can leave out much of the cultural use of sound and methods of music making. Some methods of African music making are translated more clearly though the music itself, and not in written form.

Blues and ragtime were developed during the late 19th century through the fusion of West African vocalizations, which employed the natural harmonic series and blue notes. "If one considers the five criteria given by Waterman as cluster characteristics for West African music, one finds that three have been well documented as being characteristic of Afro-American music. Call-and-response organizational procedures, dominance of a percussive approach to music, and off-beat phrasing of melodic accents have been cited as typical of the genre in virtually every study of any kind of African-American music from work songs, field or street calls, shouts, and spirituals to blues and jazz."

The roots of American popular music are deeply intertwined with African-American contributions and innovation. The earliest jazz and blues recordings emerged in the 1910s, marking the beginning of a transformative era in music. These genres were heavily influenced by African musical traditions, and they served as the foundation for many musical developments in the years to come.

As African-American musicians continued to shape the musical landscape, the 1940s witnessed the emergence of rhythm and blues (R&B). R&B became a pivotal genre, blending elements of jazz, blues, and gospel, and it laid the groundwork for the evolution of rock and roll in the following decade.

In the following years, this musical tradition expanded during the Civil Rights Movement. New technology for recording and broadcasting helped the spread of the music, inspiring popular songs and smaller styles around the world. African American music is not only for entertainment, but connects to the community, identity, and cultures.

== Historic traits ==
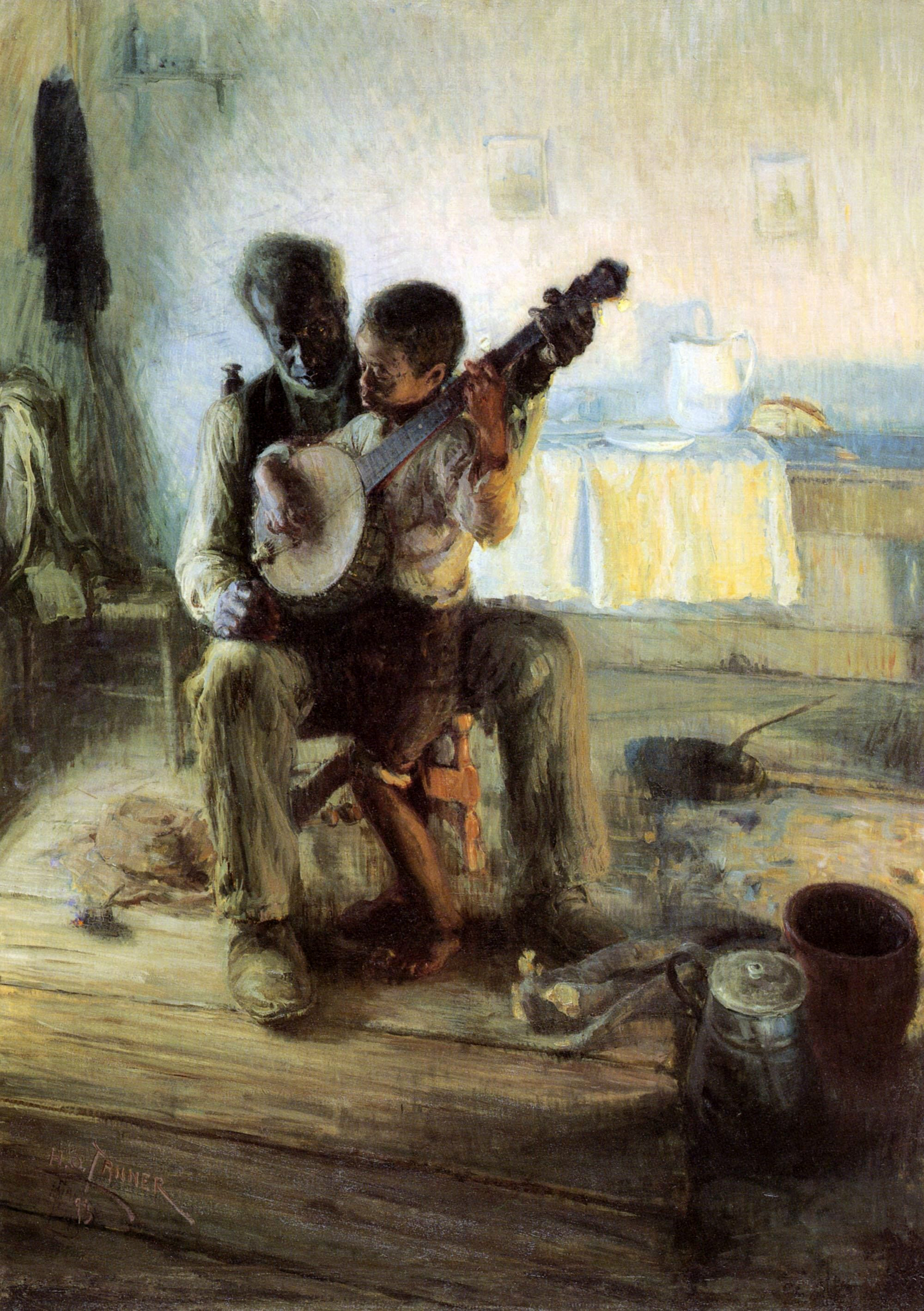
The Banjo Lesson by Henry Ossawa Tanner, 1893

Most slaves arrived in the Americas from the western coast of Africa. This area encompasses modern-day Nigeria, Mali, Benin, Ghana, Ivory Coast, Senegal, Gambia and parts of Sierra Leone. Harmonic and rhythmic features from these areas, European musical instrumentation, and the chattel slavery forced upon Black Americans all contributed to their music.

Many of the characteristic musical forms that define African-American music have historical precedents. These earlier forms include: field hollers, beat boxing, work song, spoken word, rapping, scatting, call and response, vocality (or special vocal effect: guttural effects, interpolated vocality, falsetto, melisma, vocal rhythmization), improvisation, blue notes, polyrhythms (syncopation, concrescence, tension, improvisation, percussion, swung note), texture (antiphony, homophony, polyphony, heterophony) and harmony (vernacular progressions; complex, multi-part harmony, as in spirituals, doo-wop, and barbershop music).

American composer Olly Wilson outlines "heterogeneous sound ideals" that define traditional and common patterns in African music, such as the use of timbre, pitch, volume and duration, and the incorporation of the body in making music. His findings include uses of call-and-response and the importance of interjections from the audience to express satisfaction or dissatisfaction. These heterogeneous sound ideals are also found in many other types of music.

White people sometimes taught black slaves to play Western instruments such as the fiddle and violin.

Since white colonizers viewed indigenous African religious practices that included drumming and dancing as idolatrous, the enslaved individuals conducted their music-infused religious ceremonies in private. During the eighteenth century, the slaves' informal assemblies in praise houses and brush arbor meetings featured songs and chants such as the ring shout, a circular dance accompanied by chanting and handclapping. On occasion, the participants would enter into ecstatic trances.

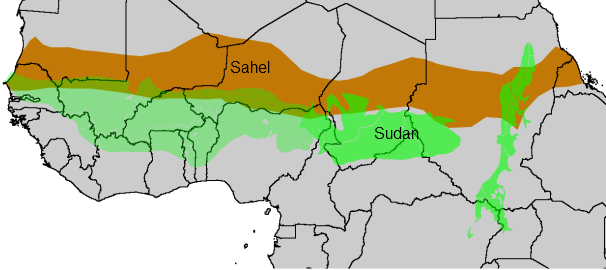
The sahel (brown) and the Sudan (green)

Paul Oliver, a Blues historian and historian of African American music and Samuel Charters, an American music historian, have suggested that the essential elements of the blues originated in the Sahel region of West Africa, brought over by Africans via the slave trade. Whereas the African slaves who were brought to South America and the Caribbean were largely from percussion based cultures in southern coastal west Africa (like southern Nigeria), central Africa and Bantu speaking parts of Africa, and lacked in many elements that created the blues, many of the slaves brought to North America were from the Sahel region and were much more familiar with stringed instruments basing the banjo on string instruments from the Sahel like akonting. Charters found that many Sahelian slaves were from Muslim cultures and favoured stringed, melodic, and melismatic solo singing, which differed from the drum-based group chanting music of other African regions. These traditions, which were sometimes permitted by plantation owners who feared drums as a tool of rebellion, thus evolved into the blues.

The historian Sylviane Diouf and ethnomusicologist Gerhard Kubik identify Islamic music as an influence on blues music. Diouf notes a striking resemblance between the Islamic call to prayer (originating from Bilal ibn Rabah, a famous Abyssinian African Muslim in the early 7th century) and 19th-century field holler music, noting that both have similar lyrics praising God, melody, note changes, "words that seem to quiver and shake" in the vocal chords, dramatic changes in musical scales, and nasal intonation. She attributes the origins of field holler music to African Muslim slaves who accounted for an estimated 30% of African slaves in America. According to Kubik, "the vocal style of many blues singers using melisma, wavy intonation, and so forth is a heritage of that large Sahel region of West Africa that had been in contact with the Islamic world via the Maghreb since the seventh and eighth centuries." There was particularly a significant trans-Saharan cross-fertilisation between the musical traditions of the Maghreb and the Sahel Where The Sahel influenced Maghrebi music like Gnawa. In contrast, very little Maghrebi & Arabic musical influence are in Sahelian music except In Sudanese popular music today where there is middle eastern instrumentation in influence but Sudanese Music remains Sahelian in its elements of music closely related to Ancient Nubian music, historian Sylviane Diouf and ethnomusicologist Gerhard Kubik identify Islamic music as an influence on blues music.

Blue note a hallmark of blues music and Rhythm and blues characterised by flattened thirds, fifths, or sevenths—has deep roots in the musical traditions of The Sahel region of West Africa, making African American popular music like the blues having a Sahelian-based origin in contrast to the more percussion based Afro-Brazilian music and Afro-Cuban music which have more of a southern coastal west African, Central African and Bantu influence where the blue note is absent and non-Muslim slaves who generally favored drums and group chants, in the American south these Sahelian African elements combined with European 12-tone musical instruments and harmony. The result has been a uniquely American music which is still widely practised in its original form and is at the foundation of another genre, American jazz.

The Griot tradition of the Sahel also may have influenced Talking blues and by extension Hip-hop, The Griot tradition is also absent in most Bantu speaking central, Eastern and Southern African cultures, Again pointing to a Sahel core origin of African American music

African-American music is also influenced by European music and Native American music.

== History ==
=== 18th century ===
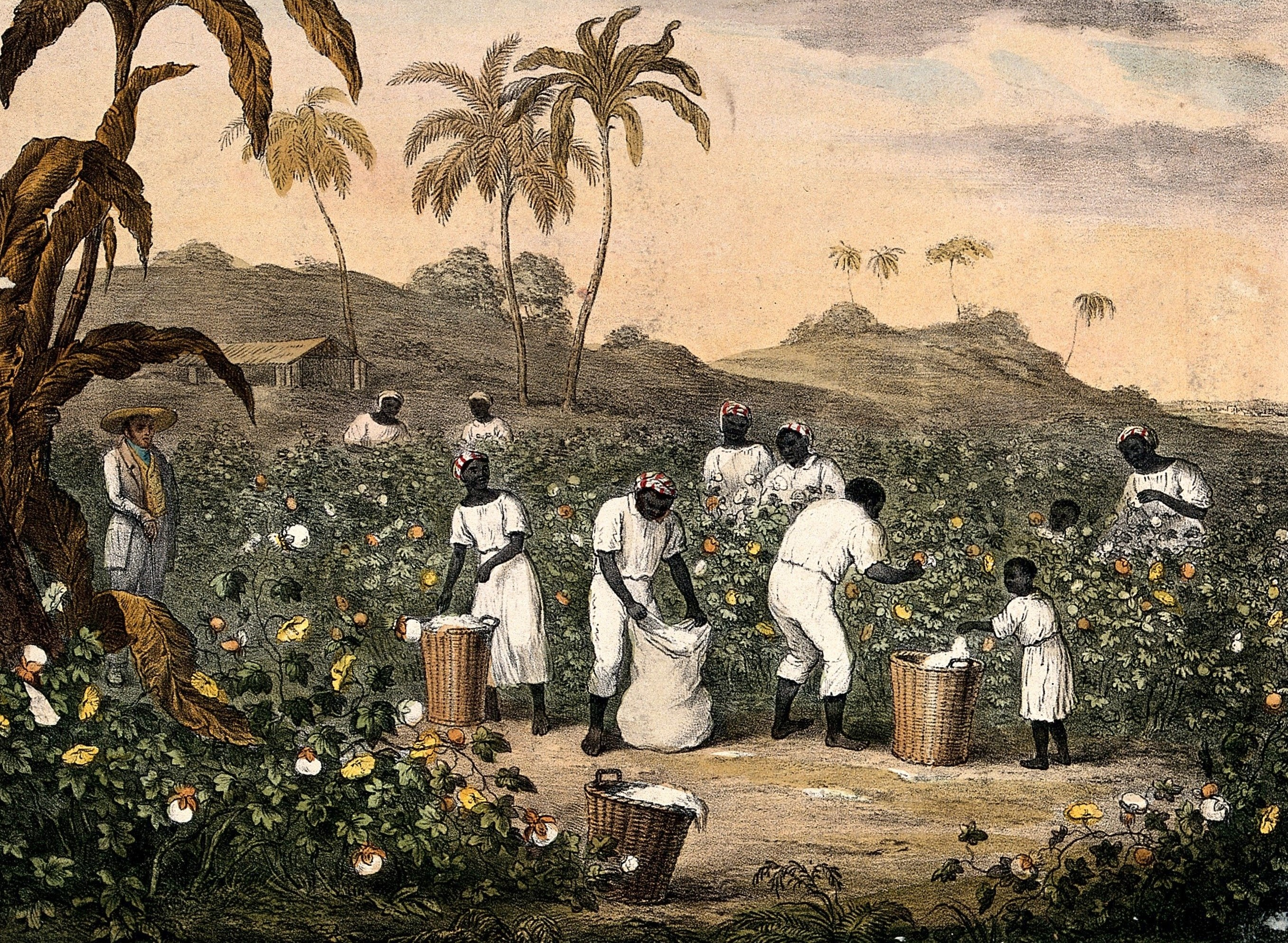
Enslaved Africans picking cotton in the United States, 1840

In the late 18th century folk spirituals originated among Southern slaves following their conversion to Christianity. Slaves reinterpreted the practice of Christianity in a way that had meaning to them as Africans in America. They often sang the spirituals in groups as they worked the plantation fields. African-American spirituals (Negro Spirituals) were created in invisible churches and regular Black churches. The hymns, melody, and rhythms were similar to songs heard in West Africa. Enslaved and free blacks created their own words and tunes. Themes include the hardships of slavery and the hope of freedom.

Spirituals from the era of slavery are called Slave Shout Songs. These shout songs are sung today by Gullah Geechee people and other African Americans in churches and praise houses. During slavery, these songs were coded messages that spoke of escape from slavery on the Underground Railroad and were sung by enslaved African Americans in plantation fields to send coded messages to other slaves, unbeknownst to the slaveholders. According to musicologist and historian Eric Sean Crawford who published Gullah Spirituals: The Sound of Freedom and Protest in the South Carolina Sea Islands, Gullah music influenced all genres of American music. Crawford said: "All genres of music have been influenced by Gullah Geechee spirituals. This music's bent notes, syncopated rhythms, and improvisational qualities heavily influenced gospel and country music. These musical traits found a secular home in the blues, jazz, and even later popular styles like hip hop". Scholar LeRhonda S. Manigault-Bryant explained Gullah spirituals are sacred music that connects Black Americans to ancestral spirits. She said: "I am suggesting that low country sacred music simultaneously takes on a cyclical and linear quality, which is best exemplified in the use of the low country clap, and the repetition of verses that literally push a song forward to invoke The Spirit. The rhythmic practices and theological motifs of this music suspend and push time by connecting with past traditions, while denoting a spiritual bond that is simultaneously ancestral, communal, and divine".

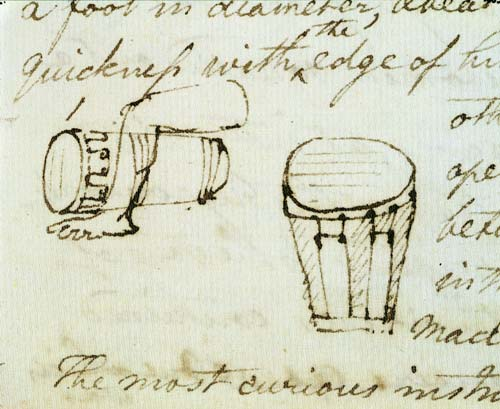
Congo Square African Drum 1819 Latrobe

Slaves also used drums to communicate messages of escape. In West Africa, drums are used for communication, celebration, and spiritual ceremonies. West African people enslaved in the United States continued to make drums to send coded messages to other slaves across plantations. The making and use of drums by enslaved Africans was outlawed after the Stono Rebellion in South Carolina in 1739. Enslaved African Americans used drums to send coded messages to start slave revolts, and white slaveholders banned the creation and use of drums. After the banning of drums, slaves made rhythmic music by slapping their knees, thighs, arms and other body parts, a practice called pattin Juba. The Juba dance was originally brought by Kongo slaves to Charleston, South Carolina, and became an African-American plantation dance performed by slaves during gatherings when rhythm instruments were prohibited.

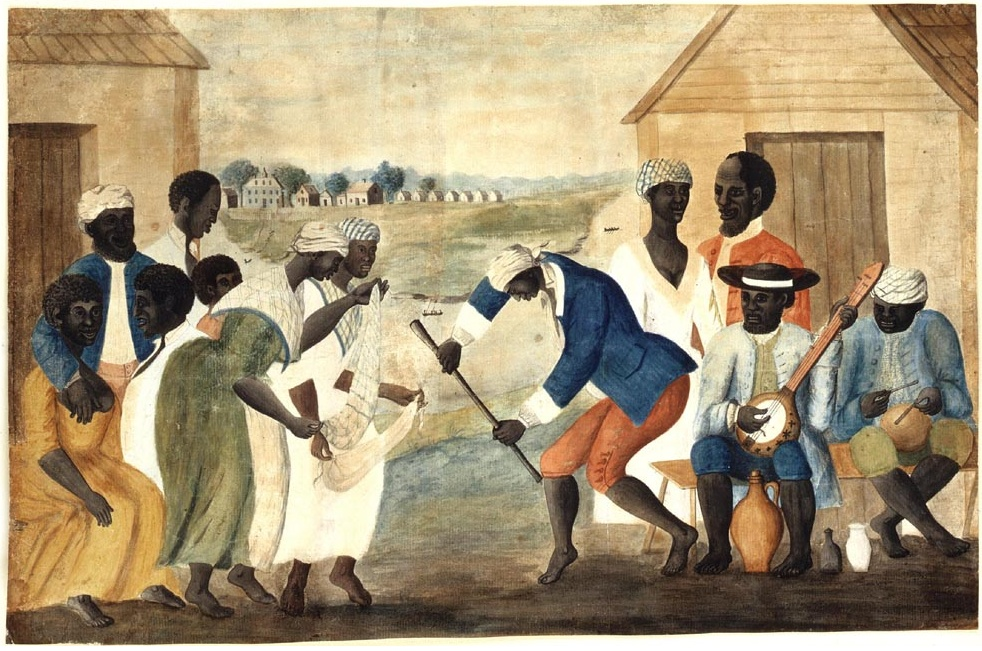
Slave dance to banjo, 1780s

Folk spirituals, unlike much white gospel, were often spirited. Slaves added dancing (later known as "the shout") and other body movements to the singing. They also changed the melodies and rhythms of psalms and hymns, by speeding up the tempo, adding repeated refrains and choruses, and replacing texts with new ones that often combined English and African words and phrases. Originally passed down orally, folk spirituals have been central in the lives of African Americans for more than three centuries, serving religious, cultural, social, political, and historical functions.

Folk spirituals were spontaneously created and performed in a repetitive, improvised style. The most common song structures are the call-and-response ("Blow, Gabriel") and repetitive choruses ("He Rose from the Dead"). The call-and-response is an alternating exchange between the soloist and the other singers. The soloist usually improvises a line to which the other singers respond, repeating the same phrase. Song interpretation incorporates the interjections of moans, cries, hollers, and changing vocal timbres, and can be accompanied by hand clapping and foot-stomping.

The Smithsonian Institution Folkways Recordings have samples of African American slave shout songs.

=== 19th century ===
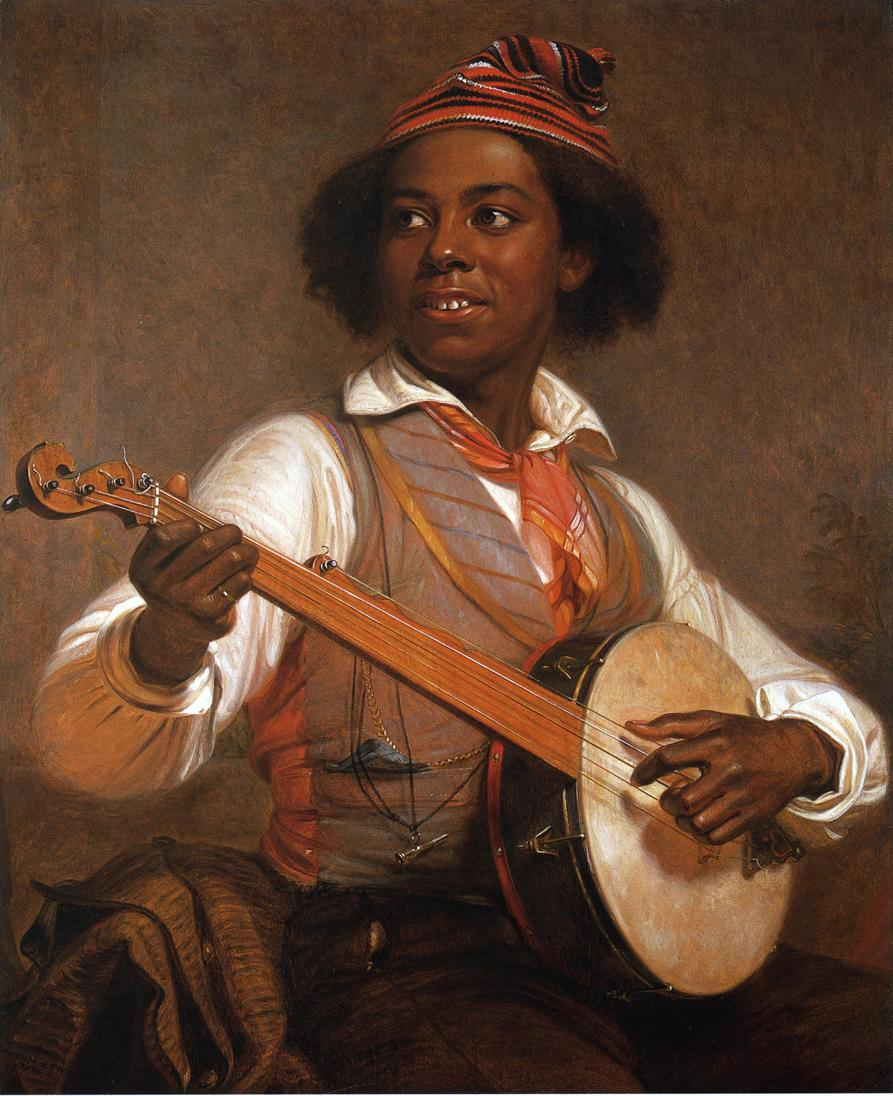
William Sidney Mount painted scenes of black and white American musicians. This 1856 painting depicts an African-American banjo player

The influence of African Americans on mainstream American music began in the 19th century with the advent of blackface minstrelsy. The banjo, of African origin, became a popular instrument, and its African-derived rhythms were incorporated into popular songs by Stephen Foster and other songwriters. Over time the banjo's construction adopted some European traditions such as a flat fingerboard. Some banjos had five strings, in contrast to the West African three-string version. This resulted in the creation of several different types of banjos in the United States.

In the 1830s, the Second Great Awakening led to a rise in Christian revivals, especially among African Americans. Drawing on traditional work songs, enslaved African Americans originated and performed a wide variety of spirituals and other Christian music. Some of these songs were coded messages of subversion against slaveholders, or signals to escape. For example, Harriet Tubman sang coded messages to her mother and other slaves in the field to let them know she was escaping on the Underground Railroad. Tubman sang: "I'm sorry I'm going to leave you, farewell, oh farewell; But I'll meet you in the morning, farewell, oh farewell, I'll meet you in the morning, I'm bound for the promised land, On the other side of Jordan, Bound for the Promised Land."

During the period after the Civil War, the spread of African-American music continued. The Fisk University Jubilee Singers first toured in 1871. Artists including Jack Delaney helped revolutionize post-war African-American music in the central-east of the United States. In the following years, professional "jubilee" troops formed and toured. The first black musical-comedy troupe, Hyers Sisters Comic Opera Co., was organized in 1876. In the last half of the 19th century, barbershops often served as community centers, where men would gather. Barbershop quartets originated with African-American men socializing in barbershops; they would harmonize while waiting their turn, singing spirituals, folk songs and popular songs. This generated a new style of unaccompanied four-part, close-harmony singing. Later, white minstrel singers stole the style, and in the early days of the recording industry their performances were recorded and sold. By the end of the 19th century, African-American music was an integral part of mainstream American culture.

=== Early 20th century (1900s–1930s) ===
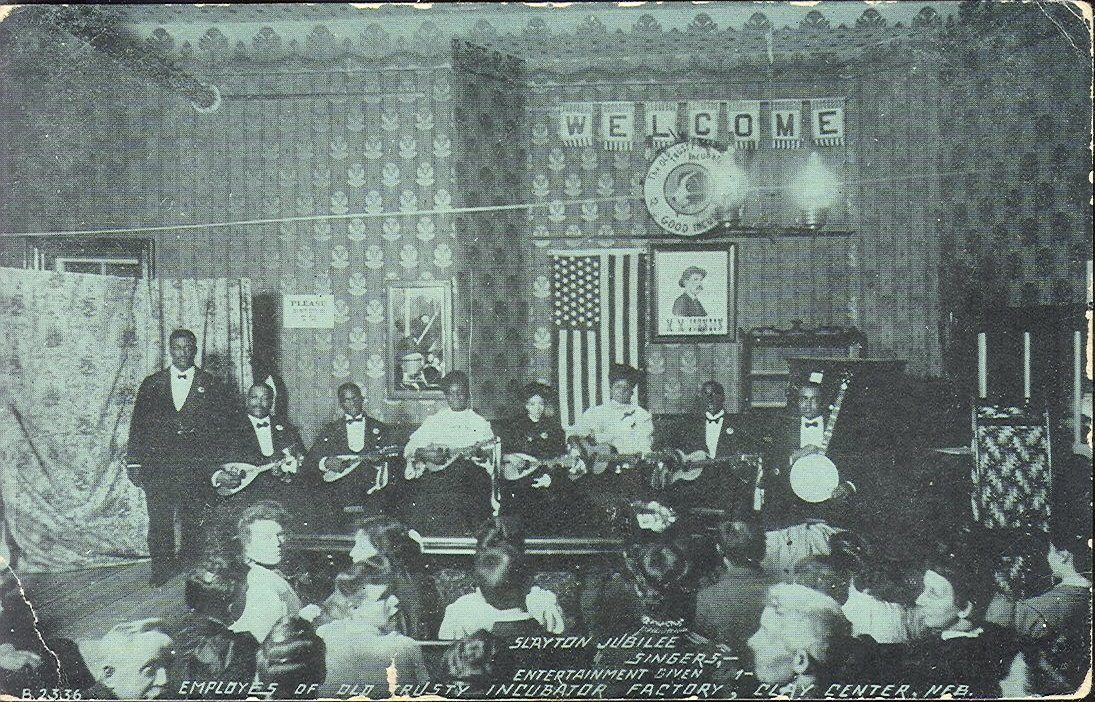
The Slayton Jubilee Singers entertain employees of the Old Trusty Incubator Factory, Clay Center, about 1910

The first musical written and produced by African Americans, by Bob Cole and Billy Johnson, debuted on Broadway in 1898. The first recording of black musicians was of Bert Williams and George Walker in 1890, featuring music from Broadway musicals. Theodore Drury helped black artists develop in opera. He founded the Drury Opera Company in 1900 and used a white orchestra, but featured black singers in leading roles and choruses. The company was only active until 1908, but it marked the first black participation in opera companies. Scott Joplin's opera Treemonisha, unique as a ragtime-folk opera, was first performed in 1911.

The early part of the 20th century saw a rise in popularity of blues and jazz. African-American music at this time was classed as "race music". Ralph Peer, musical director at Okeh Records, put records made by "foreign" groups under that label. At the time "race" was a term commonly used by the African-American press to speak of the community as a whole with an empowering point of view, as a person of "race" was one involved in fighting for equal rights. Ragtime performers such as Scott Joplin became popular and some were associated with the Harlem Renaissance and early civil rights activists. White and Latino performers of African-American music were also visible. African-American music was often altered and diluted to be more palatable for white audiences, who would not have accepted black performers, leading to genres like swing music.

By the turn of the 20th century African Americans were becoming part of classical music as well. Originally excluded from major symphony orchestras, black musicians could study in music conservatories that had been founded in the 1860s, such as the Oberlin School of Music, National Conservatory of Music, and the New England Conservatory. Black people also formed symphony orchestras in major cities such as Chicago, New Orleans, and Philadelphia. Various black orchestras began to perform regularly in the late 1890s and the early 20th century. In 1906, the first incorporated black orchestra was established in Philadelphia. In the early 1910s, all-black music schools, such as the Music School Settlement for Colored and the Martin-Smith School of Music, were founded in New York.

The Music School Settlement for Colored became a sponsor of the Clef Club orchestra in New York. The Clef Club Symphony Orchestra attracted both black and white audiences to concerts at Carnegie Hall from 1912 to 1915. Conducted by James Reese Europe and William H. Tyers, the orchestra included banjos, mandolins, and baritone horns. Concerts featured music written by black composers, notably Harry T. Burleigh and Will Marion Cook. Other annual black concert series include the William Hackney's "All-Colored Composers" concerts in Chicago and the Atlanta Colored Music Festivals.

The return of the black musical to Broadway occurred in 1921 with Sissle and Eubie Blake's Shuffle Along. In 1927, a concert survey of black music was performed at Carnegie Hall including jazz, spirituals and the symphonic music of W. C. Handy's Orchestra and the Jubilee Singers. The first major film musical with a black cast was King Vidor's Hallelujah of 1929. African-American performers were featured in the musical Show Boat (which had a part written for Paul Robeson and a chorus of Jubilee Singers), and especially all-black operas such as Porgy and Bess and Virgil Thomson's Four Saints in Three Acts of 1934. From 1900 to 1930, Black American music underwent significant evolution, laying the foundation for many modern genres and profoundly shaping American culture. The early 1900s saw the rise of ragtime, characterized by its syncopated rhythms and popularized by artists like Scott Joplin. As the decade progressed, blues music emerged from the Deep South, with pioneers such as W.C. Handy, Ma Rainey, and Bessie Smith bringing the genre to a wider audience. The 1920s, known as the Jazz Age, witnessed the explosion of jazz, a genre that combined elements of blues, ragtime, and brass band music. Musicians like Louis Armstrong, Jelly Roll Morton, and Duke Ellington became cultural icons, transforming jazz into a dominant artistic force through improvisation and swing.

This period also saw gospel music taking shape, influenced by the spirituals and hymns sung in Black churches. The Harlem Renaissance, a cultural and artistic movement centered in New York City, further propelled Black music into the mainstream, showcasing the talents of Black musicians and celebrating African American heritage. Despite systemic racism and limited opportunities, Black artists revolutionized the music industry. Their innovations during this era not only inspired the sounds of the 20th century but continue to resonate in music today, highlighting the resilience and creativity of the African American community.

The first symphony by a black composer to be performed by a major orchestra was William Grant Still's Afro-American Symphony (1930) by the New York Philharmonic. Florence Beatrice Price's Symphony in E minor was performed in 1933 by the Chicago Symphony Orchestra. In 1934, William Dawson's Negro Folk Symphony was performed by the Philadelphia Orchestra.

=== Mid-20th century (1940s–1960s) ===
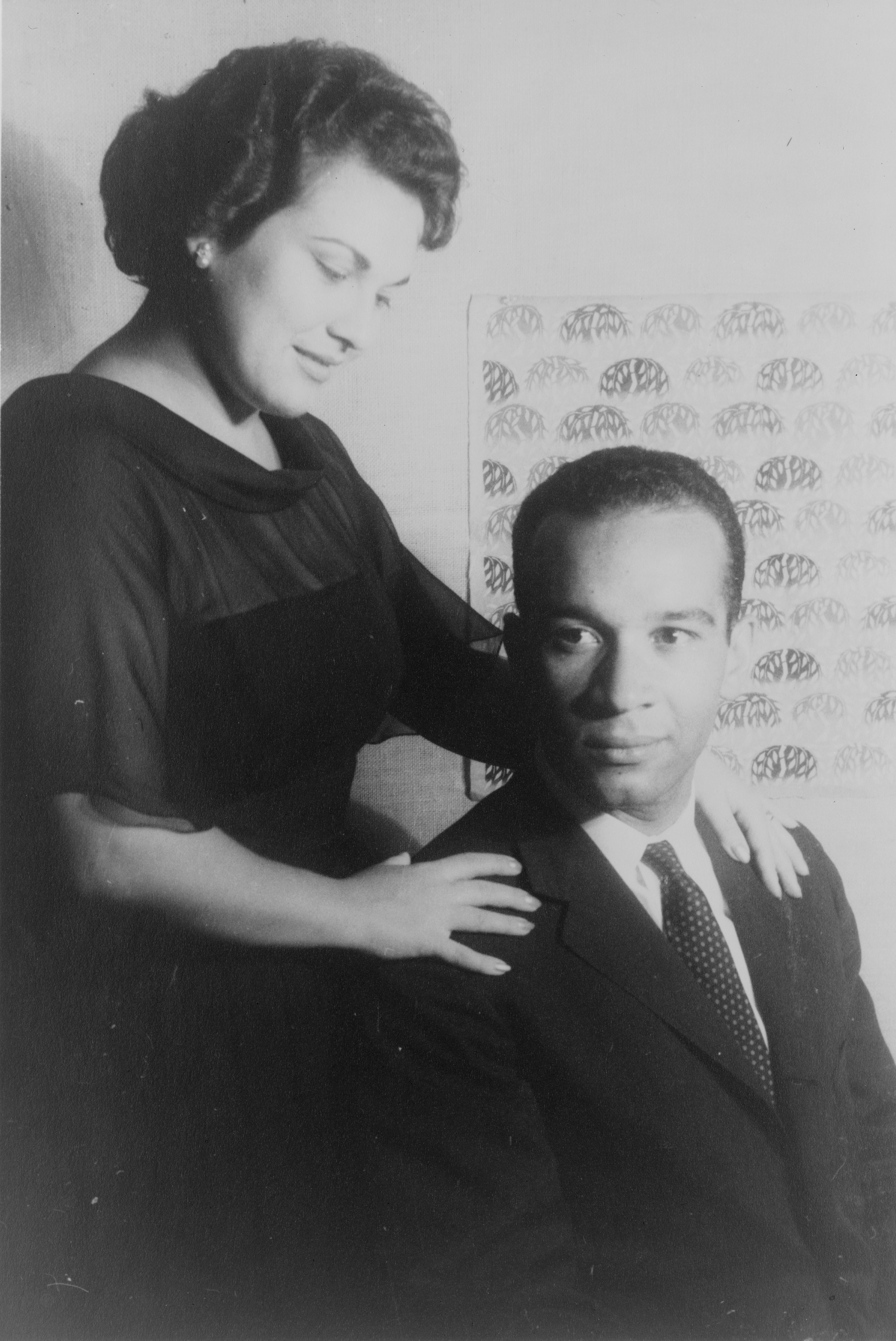
Marilyn Horne and Henry Lewis in 1961, photo by Carl Van Vechten

Billboard started making a separate list of hit records for African-American music in October 1942 with the "Harlem Hit Parade", which was changed in 1945 to "Race Records", and then in 1949 to "Rhythm and Blues Records".

By the 1940s, cover versions of African-American songs were commonplace, frequently topping the charts while the original versions did not reach the mainstream. In 1955, Thurman Ruth persuaded a gospel group to sing in the Apollo Theater. This presentation of gospel music in a secular setting was successful, and he arranged gospel caravans that traveled around the country playing venues that rhythm and blues singers had popularized. Meanwhile, jazz performers began to move away from swing towards music with more intricate arrangements, more improvisation, and technically challenging forms. This culminated in bebop, the modal jazz of Miles Davis, and the free jazz of Ornette Coleman and John Coltrane.

African-American musicians in the 1940s and 1950s were developing rhythm and blues into rock and roll, which featured a strong backbeat. Prominent exponents of this style included Louis Jordan and Wynonie Harris. Rock and roll music became commercially successful with recordings of white musicians, however, such as Bill Haley and Elvis Presley, playing a guitar-based fusion of black rock and roll and rockabilly. Rock music became more associated with white artists, although some black performers such as Chuck Berry and Bo Diddley had commercial success.

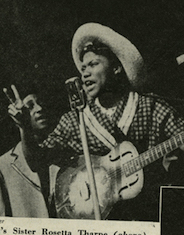
Sister Rosetta Tharpe performing at Cafe Zanzibar

In 2017, National Public Radio wrote about the career of Sister Rosetta Tharpe and concluded with these comments: Tharpe "was a gospel singer at heart who became a celebrity by forging a new path musically ... Through her unforgettable voice and gospel swing crossover style, Tharpe influenced a generation of musicians including Aretha Franklin, Chuck Berry and countless others ... She was, and is, an unmatched artist."

As the 1940s came to a close, other African Americans endeavored to concertize as classical musicians in an effort to transcend racial and nationalistic barriers in the post-war era. In 1968 Henry Lewis became the first African-American instrumentalist in a leading American symphony orchestra, an early "musical ambassador" in support of cultural diplomacy in Europe, and the first African-American conductor of a major American symphonic ensemble in 1968.

The term "rock and roll" had a strong sexual connotation in jump blues and R&B, but when DJ Alan Freed referred to rock and roll on mainstream radio in the mid 50s, "the sexual component had been dialed down enough that it simply became an acceptable term for dancing".

R&B was a strong influence on rock and roll, according to many sources, including a 1985 article in The Wall Street Journal titled, "Rock! It's Still Rhythm and Blues". The author states that the "two terms were used interchangeably", until about 1957.

Fats Domino was not convinced that there was any new genre. In 1957 he said: "What they call rock 'n' roll now is rhythm and blues. I've been playing it for 15 years in New Orleans". According to Rolling Stone, "this is a valid statement ... all Fifties rockers, black and white, country born and city bred, were fundamentally influenced by R&B, the black popular music of the late Forties and early Fifties". Elvis Presley's recognition of the importance of artists such as Fats Domino was significant, according to a 2017 article: the "championing of black musicians as part of a narrative that saw many positives in growing young white interest in African American-based musical styles". At a press event in 1969, Presley introduced Fats Domino, and said, "that's the real King of Rock 'n' Roll" ... a huge influence on me when I started out".

By the mid-1950s, many R&B songs were getting "covered" by white artists and the recordings got more airplay on the mainstream radio stations. For example, "Presley quickly covered "Tutti Frutti" ...So did Pat Boone", according to New Yorker. "In 1956, seventy-six per cent of top R.&.B. songs also made the pop chart; in 1957, eighty-seven per cent made the pop chart; in 1958, it was ninety-four per cent. The marginal market had become the main market, and the majors had got into the act."

The 1950s also saw increased popularity of blues, both in the US and the UK, in the style from the early 20th century. Doo-wop also become popular in the 1950s. Doo-wop had been developed through vocal group harmony, employing different vocal parts, nonsense syllables, little or no instrumentation, and simple lyrics. It usually involved single artists appearing with a backing group. Solo billing was given to lead singers who were more prominent in the musical arrangement. A secularized form of American gospel music called soul also developed in the mid-1950s, with pioneers such as Ray Charles, Jackie Wilson and Sam Cooke leading the wave. Soul and R&B became a major influence on surf music, and with chart-topping girl groups including The Angels and The Shangri-Las. In 1959, Hank Ballard released a song for the new dance style "The Twist", which became a new dance craze in the early '60s.

In 1959, Berry Gordy founded Motown Records, the first record label to primarily feature African-American artists, which aimed at achieving crossover success. The label developed an innovative, and commercially successful, style of soul music with distinctive pop elements. Its early roster included The Miracles, Martha and the Vandellas, Marvin Gaye, Stevie Wonder, The Temptations, and The Supremes. Black divas such as Aretha Franklin became '60s crossover stars. In the UK, British blues became a gradually mainstream phenomenon, returning to the United States in the form of the British Invasion, a group of bands led by The Beatles and The Rolling Stones who performed blues and R&B-inspired pop with both traditional and modern aspects. WGIV in Charlotte, North Carolina, was one of a few radio stations dedicated to African-American music that started during this period.

The British Invasion knocked many black artists off the US pop charts, although some, like Otis Redding, Wilson Pickett, Aretha Franklin and a number of Motown artists, continued to do well. Soul music, however, remained popular among black people through new forms such as funk, developed out of the innovations of James Brown.

In 1964 the Civil Rights Act outlawed major forms of discrimination towards African Americans and women. As tensions began to diminish, more African-American musicians crossed over into the mainstream. Some artists who successfully crossed over were Aretha Franklin, James Brown, and Ella Fitzgerald in the pop and jazz worlds, and Leontyne Price and Kathleen Battle in classical music.

By the end of the decade, black people were part of the psychedelia and early heavy metal trends, particularly by way of the ubiquitous Beatles' influence and the electric guitar innovations of Jimi Hendrix. Hendrix was among the first guitarists to use audio feedback, fuzz, and other effects pedals such as the wah wah pedal to create a unique guitar solo sound. Psychedelic soul, a mix of psychedelic rock and soul began to flourish with the 1960s culture. Even more popular among black people, and with more crossover appeal, was album-oriented soul in the late 1960s and early 1970s, which revolutionized African-American music. The genre's intelligent and introspective lyrics, often with a socially aware tone, were created by artists such as Marvin Gaye in What's Going On, and Stevie Wonder in Innervisions.

=== 1970s ===
In the 1970s, album-oriented soul continued its popularity while musicians such as Smokey Robinson helped turn it into Quiet Storm music. Funk evolved into two strands, a pop-soul-jazz-bass fusion pioneered by Sly & the Family Stone, and a more psychedelic fusion epitomized by George Clinton and his P-Funk ensemble. Disco evolved from black musicians creating soul music with an up-tempo melody. Isaac Hayes, Barry White, Donna Summer, and others helped popularize disco, which gained mainstream success.

Some African-American artists including The Jackson 5, Roberta Flack, Teddy Pendergrass, Dionne Warwick, Stevie Wonder, The O'Jays, Gladys Knight & the Pips, and Earth, Wind & Fire found crossover audiences, while white listeners preferred country rock, singer-songwriters, stadium rock, soft rock, glam rock, and, to some degree, heavy metal and punk rock.

During the 1970s, The Dozens, an urban African-American tradition of using playful rhyming ridicule, developed into street jive in the early '70s, which in turn inspired hip-hop by the late 1970s. Spoken-word artists such as The Watts Prophets, The Last Poets, Gil Scott-Heron and Melvin Van Peebles were some innovators of early hip-hop. Many youths in the Bronx used this medium to communicate the unfairness minorities faced at the time. DJs played records, typically funk, while MCs introduced tracks to the dancing audience. Over time, DJs began isolating and repeating the percussion breaks, producing a constant, eminently danceable beat, over which MCs began rapping, using rhyme and sustained lyrics. Hip-hop would become a multicultural movement in a youthful black America, led by artists such as Kurtis Blow and Run-DMC.

=== 1980s ===
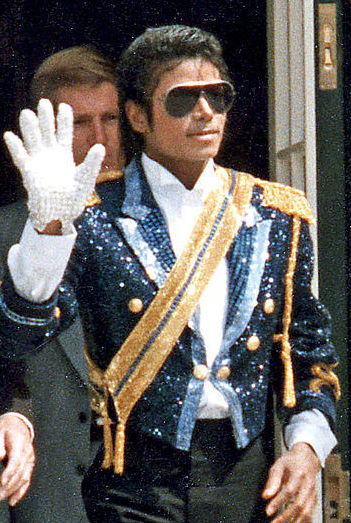
Michael Jackson leaving the White House in 1984

Michael Jackson had record-breaking success with his 1980s albums Off the Wall, Bad, and the best-selling album of all time, Thriller. Jackson paved the way for other successful crossover black solo artists such as Prince, Lionel Richie, Luther Vandross, Tina Turner, Whitney Houston, and Janet Jackson. Pop and dance-soul of this era inspired new jack swing by the end of the decade.

Hip-hop spread across the country and diversified. Techno, dance, Miami bass, post-disco, Chicago house, Los Angeles hardcore hip-hop and Washington, D.C. Go-go developed during this period, with only Miami bass achieving mainstream success. Before long, Miami bass was relegated primarily to the Southeastern US, while Chicago house had made strong headway on college campuses and dance arenas (i.e. the warehouse sound, the rave). Washington's Go-go garnered modest national attention with songs such as E.U.'s Da Butt (1988), but proved to be a mostly regional phenomena. Chicago house sound had expanded into the Detroit music environment and began using more electronic and industrial sounds, creating Detroit techno, acid, and jungle. The combination of these experimental, usually DJ-oriented, sounds with the multiethnic NYC disco sound from the 1970s and 1980s created a brand of music that was most appreciated in large discothèques in large cities. European audiences embraced this kind of electronic dance music with more enthusiasm than their North American counterparts.

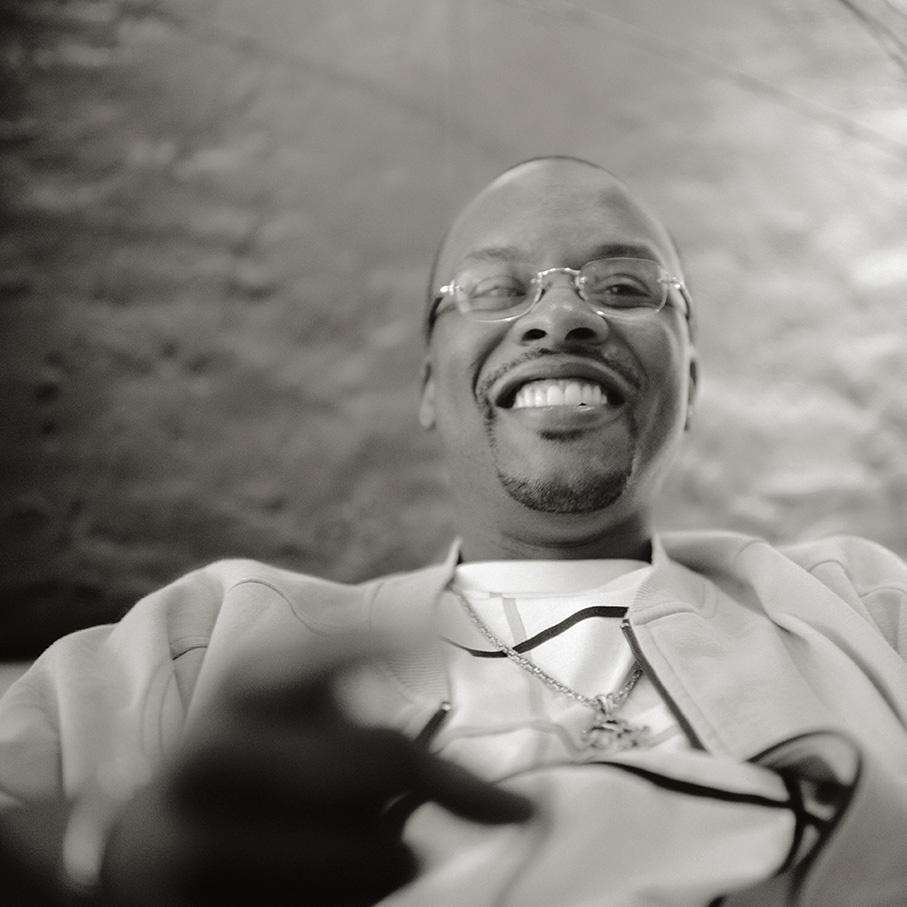
DJ Jazzy Jeff pictured in 2002.

From about 1986, rap entered the mainstream with Run-D.M.C.'s Raising Hell, and the Beastie Boys' Licensed to Ill. Licensed to Ill was the first rap album to enter the No.1 Spot on the Billboard 200 and opened the door for white rappers. Both of these groups mixed rap and rock, appealing to both audiences. Hip-hop took off from its roots and the golden age hip-hop flourished, with artists such as Eric B. & Rakim, Public Enemy, LL Cool J, Queen Latifah, Big Daddy Kane, and Salt-N-Pepa. Hip-hop became popular in the United States and became a worldwide phenomenon in the late 1990s. The golden age scene would end by the early 1990s as gangsta rap and G-funk took over, with West Coast artists Dr. Dre, Snoop Dogg, Warren G and Ice Cube, East Coast artists Notorious B.I.G., Wu-Tang Clan, and Mobb Deep, and the sounds of urban black male bravado, compassion, and social awareness.

While heavy metal music was almost exclusively created by white performers in the 1970s and 1980s, there were a few exceptions. In 1988, all-black heavy metal band Living Colour achieved mainstream success with their début album Vivid, peaking at No. 6 on the Billboard 200, thanks to their Top 20 single "Cult of Personality". The band's music contained lyrics that attack what they perceived as Eurocentrism and racism in America. A decade later, more black artists like Lenny Kravitz, Body Count, Ben Harper, and countless others would start playing rock again.

=== 1990s, 2000s, 2010s, and today ===
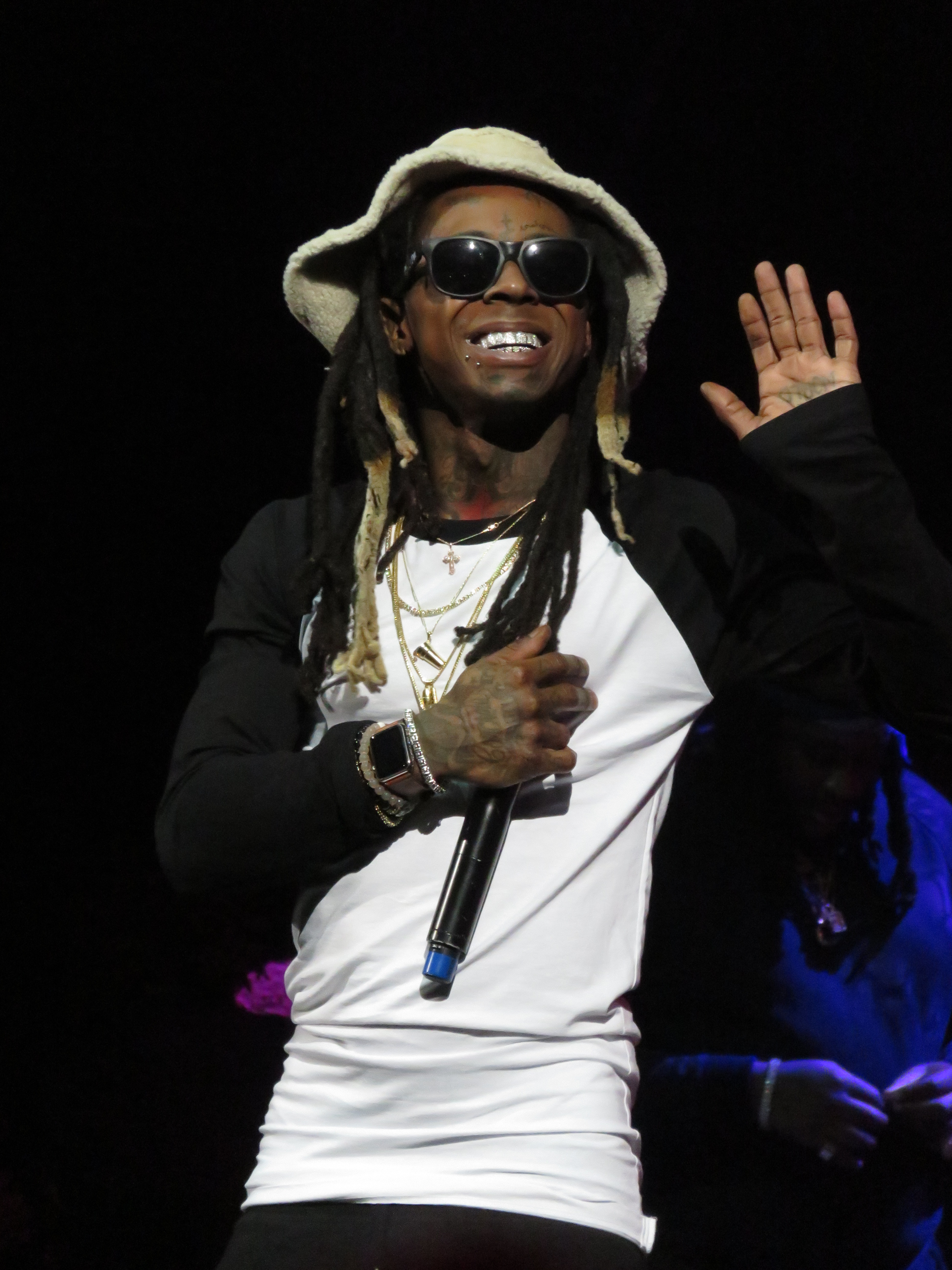
Lil Wayne is one of the top selling black American musicians in modern history. In 2008, his album (Tha Carter III) sold one million in its first week.

Contemporary R&B, the post-disco version of soul music, remained popular throughout the 1980s and 1990s. Male vocal groups such as The Temptations and The O'Jays were particularly popular, as well as New Edition, Boyz II Men, Jodeci, Dru Hill, Blackstreet, and Jagged Edge. Girl groups, including TLC, Destiny's Child, SWV, and En Vogue were also highly successful.

Singer-songwriters such as R. Kelly, Mariah Carey, Montell Jordan, D'Angelo, Aaliyah, and Raphael Saadiq of Tony! Toni! Toné! were also popular during the 1990s. Mary J. Blige, Faith Evans, and BLACKstreet popularized a fusion blend known as hip-hop soul. The neo soul movement of the 1990s, with classic soul influences, was popularized in the late 1990s and early 2000s by such artists as D'Angelo, Erykah Badu, Maxwell, Lauryn Hill, India.Arie, Alicia Keys, Jill Scott, Angie Stone, Bilal, and Musiq Soulchild. A record review claimed that D'Angelo's critically acclaimed album Voodoo (2000) "represents African American music at a crossroads ... To simply call [it] neo-classical soul ... would be [to] ignore the elements of vaudeville jazz, Memphis horns, ragtime blues, funk and bass grooves, not to mention hip-hop, that slips out of every pore of these haunted songs." Blue-eyed soul is soul music performed by white artists, including Michael McDonald, Christina Aguilera, Amy Winehouse, Robin Thicke, Michael Bolton, Jon B., Lisa Stansfield, Teena Marie, Justin Timberlake, Joss Stone, George Michael, and Anastacia. Blue-eyed soul, typically executed by Caucasian musicians, is known for its infectious hooks and melodies. It emerged from a blend of rockabilly influenced by white artists Elvis Presley and Bill Haley, as well as doo wop inspired by Dion and The Four Seasons. Notable artists in this genre include Righteous Brothers, Hall & Oates, The Rascals, Mitch Ryder & the Detroit Wheels, Dusty Springfield, Boy George, and George Michael. David Bowie's Young Americans album is considered a significant late contribution to blue-eyed soul.

Within underground circles, the Afro-punk movement garnered attention in the early 21st century, in large part due to the eponymous documentary released in 2003. This movement, including an annual festival has also contributed to bringing further light to the role of black people in punk rock since its origins in the 1970s.

Along with the singer-songwriter influence on hip-hop and R&B, there was an increase in creativity and expression through Rap music. Tupac, The Notorious B.I.G. ("Biggie"), N.W.A, Lil' Kim, Snoop Dogg, and Nas broke into the music industry. '90s rap introduced many other subgenres including Gangsta rap, Conscious rap, and Pop rap. Gangsta rap focused on gang violence, drug dealing and poverty. It was also a major player in the East Coast–West Coast hip-hop rivalry. Main players in this rivalry were Tupac and Suge Knight on the West Coast and The Notorious B.I.G. and Diddy on the East Coast.

Hip-hop remains a genre created and dominated by African-Americans. In its early years the lyrics were about the hardships of being black in the United States. White-owned record labels controlled how hip-hop was marketed, resulting in changes to the lyrics and culture of hip-hop to suit white audiences. Scholars and African-American hip-hop creators noticed this change. Hip-hop is used to sell cars, cell phones, and other merchandise.

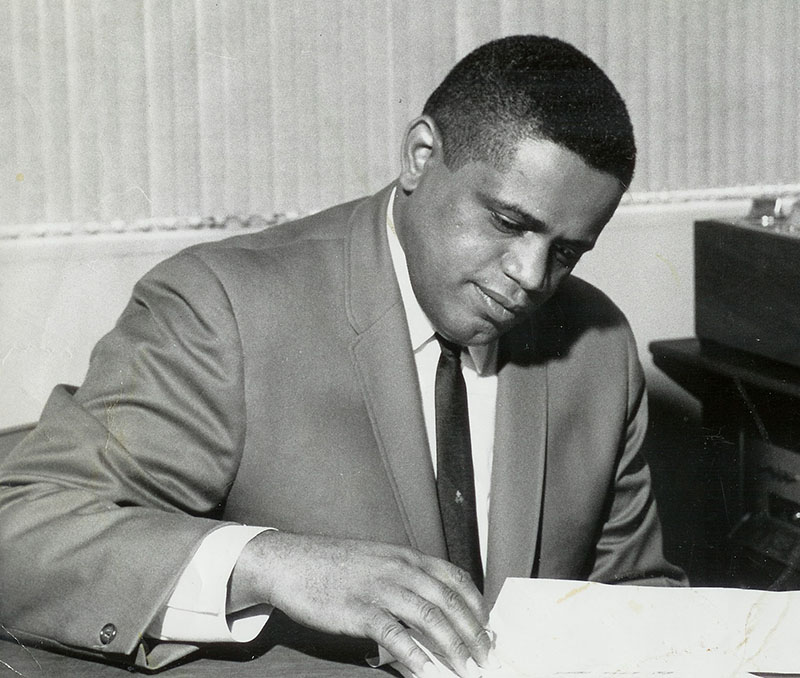
Edward Ray at Capitol Records

The hip-hop movement has become increasingly mainstream as the music industry has taken control of it. Essentially, "from the moment 'Rapper's Delight' went platinum, hiphop the folk culture became hiphop the American entertainment-industry sideshow."

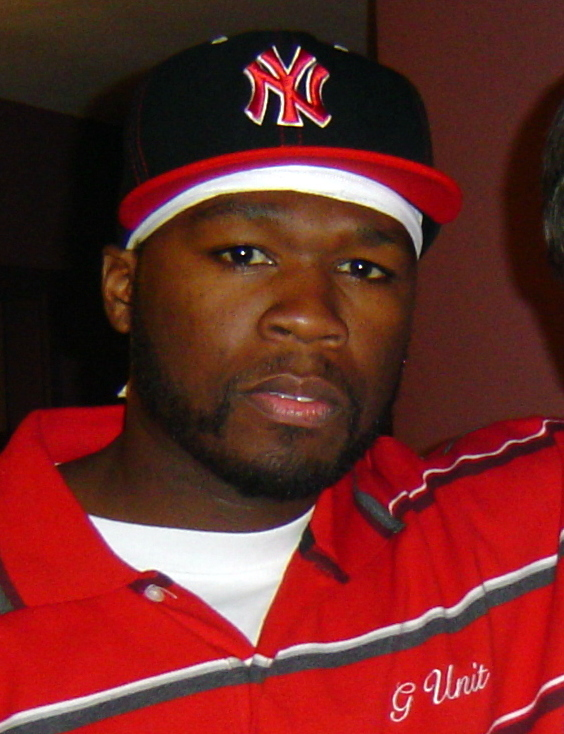
50 Cent in 2006. 50 Cent was one of the most popular African-American rappers of the 2000s with his iconic albums being Get Rich or Die Tryin' and The Massacre.

In the early 2000s, 50 Cent was one of the most popular African-American artists. In 2005, his album The Massacre sold over one million albums in its first week. In 2008, Lil Wayne's album Tha Carter III also sold more than a million copies in its first week.

Within a year of Michael Jackson's unexpected death in 2009, his estate generated $1.4 billion in revenues. A documentary containing rehearsal footage for Jackson's scheduled This Is It tour, entitled Michael Jackson's This Is It, was released on October 28, 2009, and became the highest-grossing concert film in history.

During the early 2010s, Drill music which is known as a raw and more violent version of rap also went mainstream. This wave of music came mainly from Chicago with many rappers being at the stage of the come up with the most notably being Chief Keef who blew into stardom after his tape Back from the dead and Studio Album Finally Rich.

In 2013, no African-American musician had a Billboard Hot 100 number one, the first year in which there was not a number-one record by an African-American in the chart's 55-year history. J. Cole, Beyonce, Jay Z, and half-Canadian Drake, were all top-selling music artists this year, but none made it to the Billboard Hot 100's number one, leading to much debate.

Black protest music went mainstream in the 2010s. Beyoncé, her sister Solange, Kanye West and Frank Ocean released black protest albums. Beyoncé released her first "black protest" album Lemonade in 2016. The album was dedicated to Black Lives Matter.

In 2020, Beyoncé released "Black Parade" during Juneteenth following the murder of George Floyd. Kendrick Lamar, J. Cole, The Game, Janelle Monae and D'Angelo and the Vanguard have also released music for Black Lives Matter.

In the 2020s, African-American musicians have continued to make significant contributions to the global music scene. In 2025, Beyoncé made history at the 67th Annual Grammy Awards by winning Album of the Year for Cowboy Carter—her first win in the category after four previous nominations. She also became the first Black woman to win Best Country Album. Meanwhile, Kendrick Lamar's song "Not Like Us" won both Song of the Year and Record of the Year, making it one of two hip-hop songs to win the latter award and the first outright diss track to win.

== Cultural impact ==
Through the hybridization of African, European, and Native American cultural elements, African American music has made itself "a distinctly American phenomenon".

=== Jim Crow and Civil Rights eras (early to mid 20th century) ===
The music made during the Jim Crow and Civil Rights era awakened "the passion and purposefulness of the Southern Civil Rights Movement" that "provided a stirring musical accompaniment to the campaign for racial justice and equality". African-American men, women, and children from across the nation came together in social settings such as marches, mass meetings, churches, and even jails and "conveyed the moral urgency of the freedom struggle". African-American music served to uplift the spirits and hearts of those fighting for civil rights. Guy Carawan referred to the Civil Rights Movement as "the greatest singing movement this country has experienced".

==== "We Shall Overcome" ====
Often called "the anthem of the Civil Rights Movement", "We Shall Overcome" was a hymn from the 19th-century that was used as a protest labor song in a labor strike against American Tobacco in Charleston, South Carolina in 1945–1946. It was overheard by Zilhpia Horton in a Tennessee tobacco field on a picket line in 1946, and a worker by the name of Lucille Simmons changed the original wording of "I Will Overcome" to "We Will Overcome", which made it more powerful for the Civil Rights Movement.

In 1947, Horton added some verses to the song and taught Pete Seeger her version. Seeger revised the song from "We will" to "We shall". In April 1960 at Raleigh, North Carolina, folk singer Guy Carawan sang the new version at the founding convention of the Student Nonviolent Coordinating Committee (SNCC), starting its quick spread throughout the Civil Rights Movement. Seeger, Carawan, and Frank Hamilton copyrighted the song to prevent it from becoming a "commercialized pop song".

"We Shall Overcome" continued to spread rapidly as the Civil Rights Movement gained supporters and momentum. Protestors across the nation sang the song as they marched for rights, were beat up, attacked by police dogs, and sent to jail for breaking segregation laws. "We Shall Overcome" and many other protest songs during the Civil Rights movement became its soundtrack. Outside of the U.S., the song has been used in freedom movements around the world. In India, the song is known as "Hum Honge Kaamyaab", which is a song that most school children in India know by heart.

=== Harlem Cultural Festival (1969) ===
The Harlem Cultural Festival was a series of music concerts held in Harlem's Mount Morris Park in New York City. This festival "celebrated African-American music and culture and promoted the continued politics of Black pride". At 3 pm on Sundays from June 29, 1969, to August 24, 1969, artists would perform to an audience of tens of thousands of people. Such artists that performed were Stevie Wonder, Nina Simone, B.B. King, Sly and the Family Stone, The 5th Dimension, Gladys Knight & the Pips, Mahalia Jackson, and many others.

=== Wattstax Benefit Concert (1972) ===
The Wattstax Benefit Concert was a concert organized by Stax Records held on August 20, 1972, that was held at the Los Angeles Memorial Coliseum. It was held on the seventh anniversary of the Watts riots that occurred in 1965. Some artists that performed in this concert include The Staple Singers, Richard Pryor, Carla Thomas, Rufus Thomas, Luther Ingram, Kim Weston, Johnnie Taylor, The Bar-Keys, The Emotions, Isaac Hayes, and Albert King.

== Economic impact ==
Record stores played a vital role in African-American communities for many decades. In the 1960s and 1970s, between 500 and 1,000 black-owned record stores operated in the American South, and probably twice as many in the United States as a whole. According to The Political economy of Black Music By Norman Kelley, "Black music exists in a neo-colonial relationship with the $12 billion music industry, which consist of six record companies." African-American entrepreneurs embraced record stores as key vehicles for economic empowerment and critical public spaces for black consumers at a time that many black-owned businesses were closing amid desegregation. Countless African Americans have worked as musical performers, club owners, radio deejays, concert promoters, and record label owners. Many companies use African-American music to sell their products. Companies like Coca-Cola, Nike, and Pepsi have used African-American music in advertising.

== International influence ==
Jazz and hip-hop traveled to Africa and Asia and influenced other genres of African and Asian Music. Many state that without African-American music, there would be no American music. The songs that Africans brought to America created a foundation for American music. The textural styles, slang and African-American Vernacular English influenced American pop culture and global culture. The way African Americans dress in hip-hop videos and how African Americans talk is copied in the American market and the global market.

=== Afrobeat ===
Afrobeat is a Nigerian music genre created by Nigerian artist Fela Kuti. Afrobeat began during the early twentieth century from Nigeria with a combination of Highlife, Yoruba music and jazz. The years between the wars (1918–1939) were a particularly fertile time for the formation of pan-West African urban musical traditions. Kuti fused traditional West African music with African-American music of Jazz, R&B, and other genres of West African and African-American music. James Brown's funk music, dance style, and African-American drumming influenced Afrobeat. In London, Kuti joined jazz and rock bands, and returned to Nigeria, creating Afrobeat by fusing African-American and traditional Yoruba music with Highlife music. In 1969, Kuti toured the United States and became inspired by the political activism of African Americans. He studied the life of Malcolm X and was inspired by his pro-black speeches. This resulted in a change in Kuti's message as he began discussing the political issues in Africa and Nigeria. In contrast, "Afrobeats" is a term applied to a large range of genres popular all over Africa. Music referred to as Afrobeats, in contrast to Kuti, is frequently upbeat, digitally generated, and sung in English, West African, and pidgin languages. Kuti's music was characterized by its political content and orchestral style, whereas Afrobeats took influence from many musical themes found in R&B and hip-hop, like love, sex, drugs, money, hard times, and fame.

=== Racial appropriation and insensitivity in K-pop music ===
Hip-hop came to Korea in the 1990s and developed into Korean hip-hop and Korean K-pop music. Some Korean artists have appropriated African-American vernacular and other aspects of Black culture. Groups like the girl group Mamamoo have been known to dress in blackface, and others speak in "blaccents" and wear their hair in ethnic styles. Artist Zico has used the word nigger in his music, and has claimed that he has a "black soul." As of 2020, within "K-pop, blackface, mouthing or saying racial slurs, and purely aesthetic uses of Black culture and hairstyles" were still common, without necessarily understanding, honoring or crediting their African-American roots. According to sources cited in a 2020 Guardian article, many K-pop artists do not show support for African-American social justice issues: "[M]any international fans are waiting for the industry to develop a more sensitive, globalized understanding of race." In Korean there are phrases that have been misconstrued to sound like a racial slur. These include the phrase "because of" (니까), pronounced 'nikka' and the word "you" or "you're" (니가), pronounced 'neega'.

== See also ==
- African-American culture
- African-American dance
- African-American musical theater
- Afro-Caribbean music
- Blackface
- Cultural appropriation
- Culture of Africa
- Culture of the United States
- Culture of the Southern United States
- Gandy dancer
- Groove (music)
- Juke joint
- List of musical genres of the African diaspora
- Music of Africa
- Music of the African diaspora
- Cajun music
- Creole music – Music genre preceding lala, zydeco, and cajun music
- Neo soul
- Music of Baltimore
- Music of Detroit
- Music of Georgia (U.S. state)
- Music of New Orleans
- Music of the United States
- National Museum of African American Music
- African-American women work songs
- African-American Music Appreciation Month – Annual celebration of African-American music in the US
- Latin American music in the United States
