= Counter-melody =

Musical component

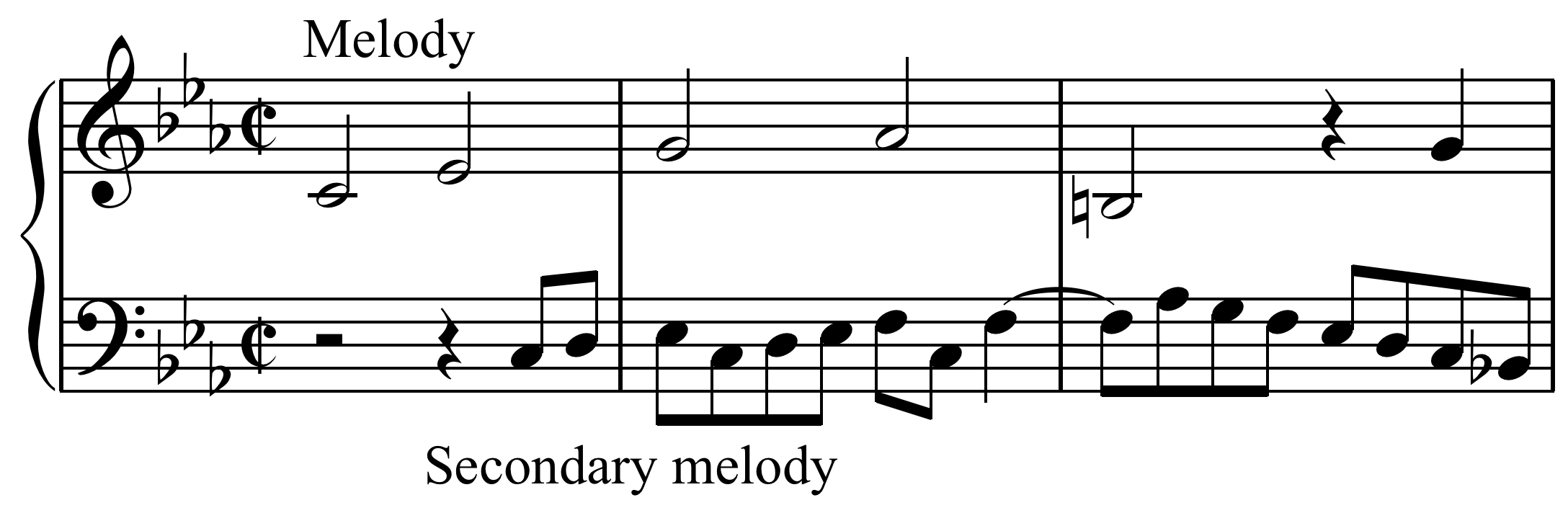
Primary and secondary melody in Bach's BWV 1079

In music, a counter-melody (often countermelody) is a sequence of notes, perceived as a melody, written to be played simultaneously with a more prominent lead melody. In other words, it is a secondary melody played in counterpoint with the primary melody. A counter-melody performs a subordinate role, and it is typically heard in a texture consisting of a melody plus accompaniment.

In marches, the counter-melody is often given to the trombones or horns. American composer David Wallis Reeves is credited with this innovation in 1876.

The more formal term countersubject applies to a secondary or subordinate melodic idea in a fugue. A countermelody differs from a harmony part sung by a backup singer in that whereas the harmony part typically lacks its own independent musical line, a countermelody is a distinct melodic line. Including a counter melody makes the music become polyphonic, a type of texture where there are two or more melodies. This can also be called counterpoint or contrapuntal.

== See also ==
- Middle eight
- Nebenstimme
- Parallel harmony
- Traditional sub-Saharan African harmony
