= Constant structure =

Music composition and performance technique

In jazz, a constant structure is a chord progression consisting of three or more chords of the same type or quality. Popularized by pianists Bill Evans and Herbie Hancock, the combination of functional and nonfunctional chords provides cohesiveness while producing a free and shifting tonal center.

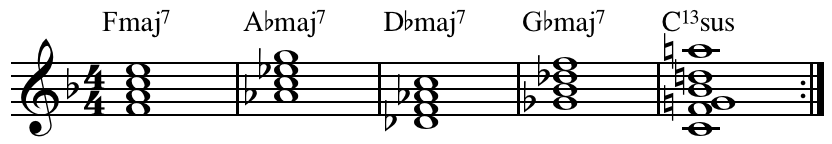
Constant structure example

For example, the progression F^{maj7}–A♭^{maj7}–D♭^{maj7}–G♭^{maj7}–C^{13sus4} contains four major seventh chords (and one thirteenth chord), none of which are diatonic to the key of F major except the first.

A vi–ii–V–I chord progression in C

In contrast, the vi–ii–V–I or circle progression from classical theory contains four chords of two or three different qualities: major, minor, and possibly a dominant seventh chord; all of which, however, are diatonic to the key. Thus diversity is achieved within a stable and fixed tonal center.

== See also ==
- Parallel harmony
- Side-slipping
