= Hauptstimme and Nebenstimme =

Primary and secondary voices in a musical composition

Hauptstimme (first violin) and Nebenstimme (viola) marked in Arnold Schoenberg's Fourth String Quartet, mm. 27–31.

In music, Hauptstimme (German for primary voice) or Hauptsatz is the main voice, chief part; i.e., the contrapuntal or melodic line of primary importance, in opposition to Nebenstimme. Nebenstimme (German for secondary voice) or Seitensatz is the secondary part; i.e., a secondary contrapuntal or melodic part, always occurring simultaneously with, and subsidiary to, the Hauptstimme. The practice of marking the primary voice within the musical score/parts was invented by Arnold Schoenberg.

The terms are used primarily by Arnold Schoenberg, Alban Berg, and Anton Webern, but are not uncommon in scores for string quartet. They are commonly indicated in musical scores with the marks "H" and "N" ligatured with the right half of a T (𝆦 and 𝆧). When the "primary voice" ends in one instrument/staff/part, it may be marked with a closing bracket (such as 𝆨) at the point where it passes to another instrument/staff/part.

Further contrapuntal lines or material may be considered accompaniment.

Other examples of the terms' use include lead and back up vocals, melody and counter-melody.

In a footnote to a musical score, Schoenberg wrote, "The human voice is always Hauptstimme [when present]."

== Counter-melody ==
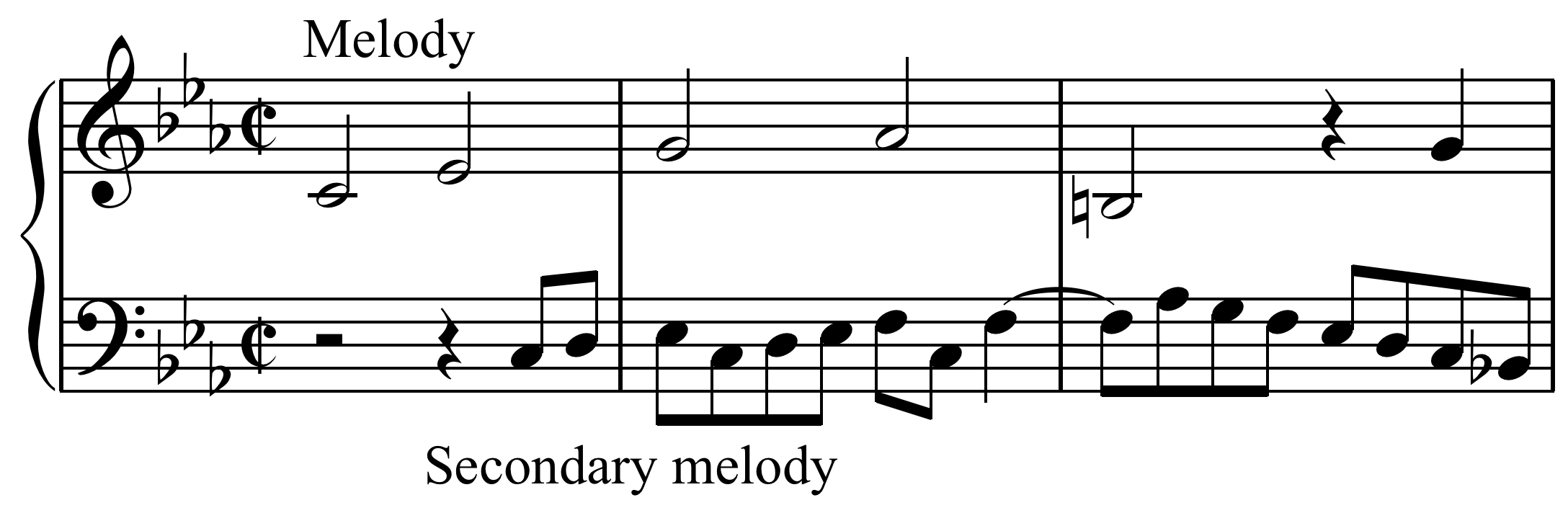
Primary and secondary melody in Bach's BWV 1079

In music, a counter-melody (often countermelody) is a sequence of notes, perceived as a melody, written to be played simultaneously with a more prominent lead melody: a secondary melody played in counterpoint with the primary melody. A counter-melody performs a subordinate role, and is typically heard in a texture consisting of a melody plus accompaniment.

In marches, the counter melody is often given to the trombones or horns (American composer David Wallis Reeves is credited with this innovation in 1876.) The more formal term countersubject applies to a secondary or subordinate melodic idea in a fugue. A countermelody differs from a barbershop quartet-style harmony part sung by a backup singer in that whereas the harmony part typically lacks its own independent musical line, a countermelody is a distinct melodic line.

== Hauptrhythmus ==
A Hauptrhythmus (plural Hauptrhythmen) is a rhythmic motif or cell.

The Hauptrhythmus of Alban Berg's Chamber Concerto is:

== In Unicode ==
In Unicode, the Hauptstimme, Nebenstimme, and closing bracket symbols are part of the Musical Symbols and are coded as follows:

Character	Official designation
𝆦	U+1D1A6 MUSICAL SYMBOL HAUPTSTIMME
𝆧	U+1D1A7 MUSICAL SYMBOL NEBENSTIMME
𝆨	U+1D1A8 MUSICAL SYMBOL END OF STIMME

== See also ==
- Parallel harmony
- Traditional sub-Saharan African harmony
