= Sonority =

Sonority may refer to:

- sonorant
- sonority hierarchy, a ranking of speech sounds (or phones) by amplitude
- In music theory, a chord, particularly when speaking of non-traditional harmonies
- Audio management software, produced by Olympus
- Sonority (album)
