= Norman Kelley (journalist) =

American journalist

Norman Kelley is a freelance journalist, author, and former segment producer at WBAI 99.5 FM.

Kelley has written for numerous publications, including LA Weekly, The Village Voice, Newsday, and Brooklyn Rail. Kelley is also working on 90-minute documentary entitled The Head Negro in Charge Syndrome which will discuss what he describes as the "dead end" in African-American political thought.

== Books ==
- The Head Negro in Charge Syndrome: The Dead End of Black Politics (Nation Books, 2004),
- Black Heat (Amistad)
- The Big Mango. Akashic Books. 2000. p. 277. ISBN 978-1-888451-10-8. "Norman Kelley (journalist)."
- A Phat Death. Akashic Books. 2003. ISBN 978-1-888451-48-1.
- Brooklyn Noir (Akashic Books) (contributor)
- Gig: Americans Talk About Their Jobs at the Turn of the Millennium (Random House 2000) (contributor)
- R&B (Rhythm and Business): The Political Economy of Black Music (Akashic Books) (editor)
