= Homophony =

Texture in music

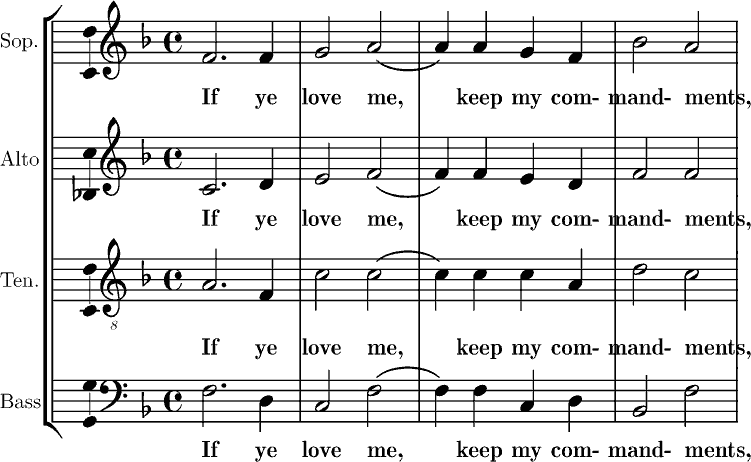
Homophony in Tallis' "If Ye Love Me", composed in 1549. The soprano sings the melody (the primary line) while the lower voices fill out the harmony (as supporting lines). The rhythmic unison in all the parts makes this passage an example of homorhythm.

In music, homophony (/həˈmɒf(ə)niː, hoʊ-/;, Greek: ὁμόφωνος, homóphōnos, from ὁμός, homós, "same" and φωνή, phōnē, "sound, tone") is a texture in which a primary part is supported by one or more additional strands that provide the harmony. One melody predominates while the other parts play either single notes or an elaborate accompaniment. This differentiation of roles contrasts with equal-voice polyphony (in which similar lines move with rhythmic and melodic independence to form an even texture) and monophony (in which all parts move in unison or octaves). Historically, homophony and its differentiated roles for parts emerged in tandem with tonality, which gave distinct harmonic functions to the soprano, bass, and inner voices.

A homophonic texture may be homorhythmic, which means that all parts have the same rhythm. Chorale texture is another variant of homophony. The most common type of homophony is melody-dominated homophony, in which one voice, often the highest, plays a distinct melody, and the accompanying voices work together to articulate an underlying harmony.

Initially, in Ancient Greece, homophony indicated music in which a single melody is performed by two or more voices in unison or octaves, i.e. monophony with multiple voices. Homophony as a term first appeared in English with Charles Burney in 1776, emphasizing the concord of harmonized melody.

== History ==
=== European music ===
Homophony first appeared as one of the predominant textures in Western classical music during the Baroque period in the early 17th century, when composers began to commonly compose with vertical harmony in mind, the homophonic basso continuo becoming a definitive feature of the style. In Western music, homophony may have originated in dance music, in which a simple and direct rhythmic style was needed for the prescribed bodily movements of individual dances. Homophony and polyphony coexisted in the 1600s and 1700s. Polyphony was the common melody during the Renaissance period. During the Baroque period, monophony became the new modern style. The choral arrangement of four voices (soprano, alto, tenor, and bass) has since become common in Western classical music. Homophony began by appearing in sacred music, replacing polyphony and monophony as the dominant form, but spread to secular music, for which it is one of the standard forms today.

Composers known for their homophonic work during the Baroque period include Claudio Monteverdi, Antonio Vivaldi, George Frideric Handel, and Johann Sebastian Bach.

In 20th-century classical music some of the "triad-oriented accompanimental figures such as the Alberti bass [a homophonic form of accompaniment] have largely disappeared from usage and, rather than the traditional interdependence of melodic and chordal pitches sharing the same tonal basis, a clear distinction may exist between the pitch materials of the melody and harmony, commonly avoiding duplication. However, some traditional devices, such as repeated chords, are still used.

Jazz and other forms of modern popular music generally feature homophonic influences, following chord progressions over which musicians play a melody or improvise.

=== African and Asian music ===
Homophony has appeared in several non-Western cultures, perhaps particularly in regions where communal vocal music has been cultivated. When explorer Vasco da Gama landed in West Africa in 1497, he referred to the music he heard there as being in "sweet harmony". While the concept of harmony in that time was not necessarily the same as the concept of homophony as understood by modern scholars, it is generally accepted that homophonic voice harmonies were commonplace in African music for centuries before contact with Europeans and is common in African music today. Singers normally harmonize voices in homophonic parallelism moving in parallel thirds or fourths. This type of harmonic model is also implemented in instrumental music where voices are stacked in thirds or fourths. Homophonic parallelism is not restricted to thirds and fourths, however all harmonic material adheres to the scalar system the particular tune or song is based on. The use of harmony in sixths is common in areas where a hexatonic scale system is used . For instance, the Fang people of Gabon use homophony in their music.

In eastern Indonesia (i.e. in the music of the Toraja in South Sulawesi, in Flores, in East Kalimantan and in North Sulawesi), two-part harmonies are common, usually in intervals of thirds, fourths or fifths. Additionally, Chinese music is generally thought to be homophonic, since instruments typically provide accompaniment in parallel fourths and fifths and often double the voice in vocal music, heterophony also being common in China.

== Melody-dominated homophony ==
In melody-dominated homophony, accompanying voices provide chordal support for the lead voice, which assumes the melody. Some popular music today might be considered melody-dominated homophony, voice typically taking on the lead role, while instruments like piano, guitar and bass guitar normally accompany the voice. In many cases, instruments also take on the lead role, and often the role switches between parts, voice taking the lead during a verse and instruments subsequently taking solos, during which the other instruments provide chordal support.

Monody is similar to melody-dominated homophony in that one voice becomes the melody, while another voice assumes the underlying harmony. Monody, however, is characterized by a single voice with instrumental accompaniment, whereas melody-dominated homophony refers to a broader category of homophonic music, which includes works for multiple voices, not just works for solo voice, as was the tradition with early 17th century Italian monody.

Melody dominated homophony in Chopin's Nocturne in E Op. 62 No. 2. The left hand (bass clef) provides chordal support for the melody played by the right hand (treble clef).

== See also ==
- Counterpoint
