= Parallel harmony =

Musical voice leading practice

In music, parallel harmony, also known as harmonic parallelism, harmonic planing or parallel voice leading, is the parallel movement of two or more melodies (see voice leading).

== Effects ==
When all voices between chords move in parallel motion, this generally reduces or negates the effect of harmonic progression. However, "occasionally chords such as the tonic and dominant may create the sense of harmonic progression".

== Illustrative example ==
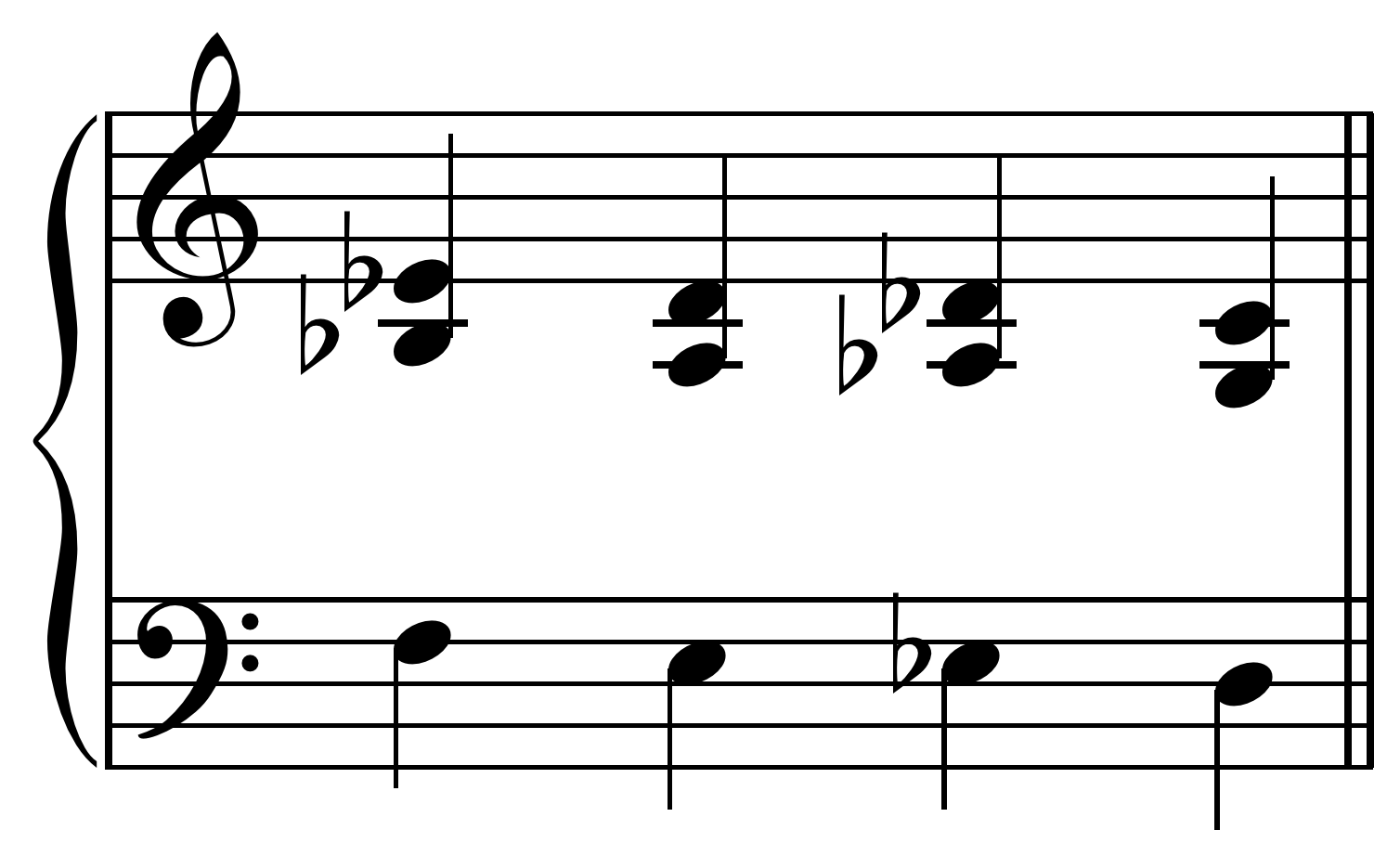
Quartal chords descending by semitone

Lines with parallel harmony can be viewed as a series of chords with the same intervallic structure. Parallel means that each note within the chord rises or falls by the same interval.

== Examples from works ==
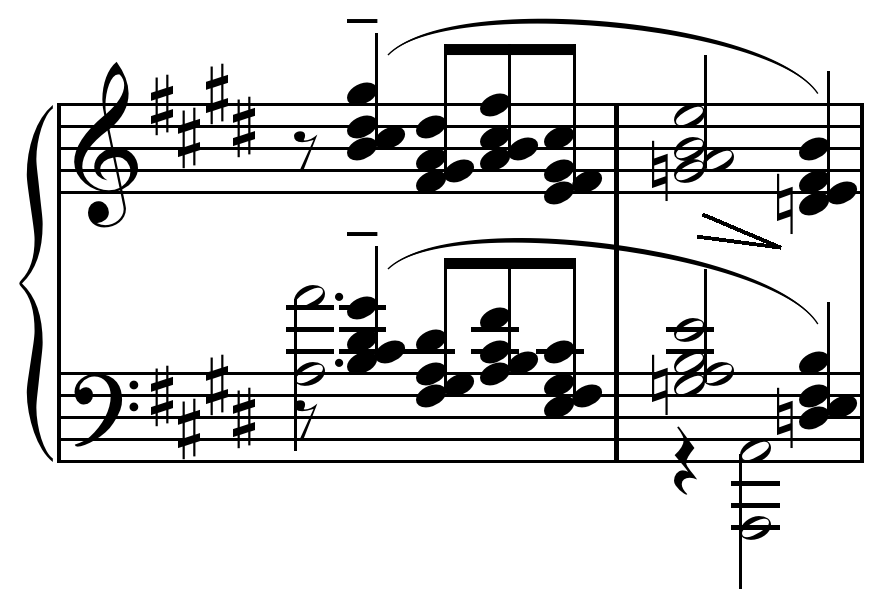
Diatonic planing from "Feuilles mortes" ("Dead Leaves") by Claude Debussy.

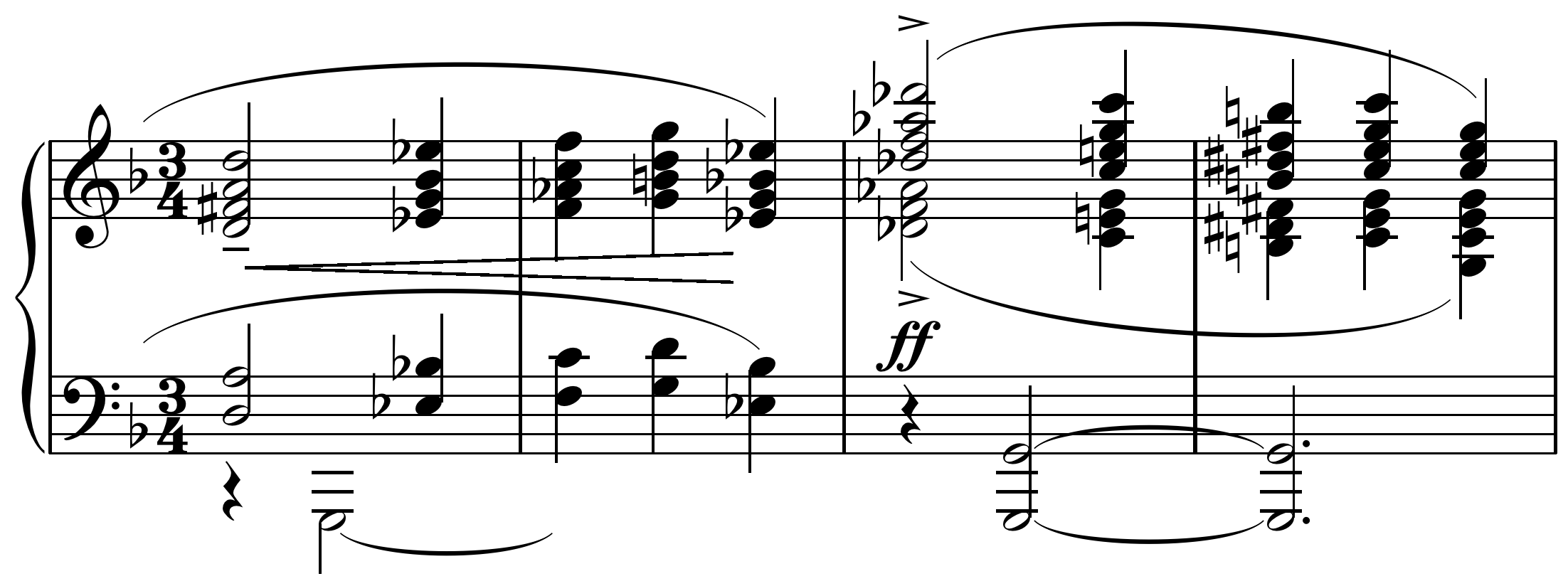
Triadic planing from Le Tombeau de Couperin by Maurice Ravel.

The "organ chords" in Debussy's tenth prélude, La cathédrale engloutie

Prominent examples include:

- Claude Debussy's Beau soir (1880), Prélude à l'après-midi d'un faune (1894), Nocturnes (1899), La Mer (1905), La cathédrale engloutie, "Voiles", "Feuilles mortes"
- Maurice Ravel's Daphnis and Chloë Suite No. 2 (1913), "Menuet" from Le Tombeau de Couperin
- Erik Satie's Le Fils des étoiles (1892)
- Igor Stravinsky's The Rite of Spring (1913)
- Olivier Messiaen's music features abundant planing
- Richard Strauss's Elektra (1909)
- Arnold Schoenberg's Pierrot lunaire, "Columbine" (1914)
- William Schuman's Three Score Set for Piano (1944)
- John Williams's "Rebel Fanfare" from Star Wars

In the Schuman example (Three Score Set for Piano), the inversions of the chords suggest a bichordal effect.

In the example on the top right, we see a series of quartal chords in parallel motion, in which the intervallic relationship between each consecutive chord member, in this case a minor second, is consistent. Each note in the chord falls by one semitone in each step, from F, B♭, and E♭ in the first chord to D, G, and C in the last.

== Usage in electronic music ==
Parallel harmony is frequently used in house music and other electronic music genres. Historically, this resulted from producers sampling chords from soul or jazz and then playing them at different pitches, or using "chord memory" feature from classic polyphonic synthesizers. Modern digital audio workstations offer similar chord-generating tools for achieving parallel harmony.

== See also ==
- Block chord
- Consecutive fifths
- Constant structure
- Parallel key
- Parallel chord
- Side-slipping
- Traditional sub-Saharan African harmony
- Doubling (music)

== Bibliography ==
- Benward, Bruce; Saker, Marilyn (2009). Music in Theory and Practice. Vol. II (Eight ed.). New York: McGraw-Hill. ISBN 978-0-07-310188-0.
