= Traditional sub-Saharan African harmony =

Music theory of harmony

Traditional sub-Saharan African harmony is a music theory of harmony in sub-Saharan African music based on the principles of homophonic parallelism (chords based around a leading melody that follow its rhythm and contour), homophonic polyphony (independent parts moving together), counter-melody (secondary melody) and ostinato-variation (variations based on a repeated theme). Polyphony (contrapuntal and ostinato variation) is common in African music and heterophony (the voices move at different times) is a common technique as well. Although these principles of traditional African music are of Pan-African validity, the degree to which they are used in one area over another (or in the same community) varies. Specific techniques that are used to generate harmony in Africa are the "span process", "pedal notes" (a held note, typically in the bass, around which other parts move), "rhythmic harmony", "harmony by imitation", and "scalar clusters" (see below for explanation of these terms).

== General overview ==
"By Western standards, African music is characteristically complex...Two or more events tend to occur simultaneously within a musical context. Even players of simple solo instruments (such as the musical bow or the flute) manage to manipulate the instrument in such a way to produce simultaneous sounds by playing overtones with the bow, by humming while bowing, and the like...Overlapping choral antiphony and responsorial singing are principal types of African polyphony. Various combinations of ostinato and drone-ostinato, polymelody (mainly two-part), and parallel intervals are additional polyphonic techniques frequently employed. Several types may intermingle within one vocal or instrumental piece, with the resulting choral or orchestral tendency being the stacking of parts or voices. Consequently three- or four-part density is not an uncommon African musical feature. Such densities are constantly fluctuating so that continuous triads throughout an entire piece are uncommon. Canonic imitation may occur in responsorial or antiphonal sections of African music as a result of the repetition of the first phrase or the introduction of new melodic material in the form of a refrain. The latter may involve a contrasting section or a completion of the original melody." —Karlton E. Hester

Chordal relationships that occur as a result of the polyphony, homophonic parallelism and homophonic polyphony found in African music are not always 'functional' in the western musical sense. However, they accomplish the balance of tension-release and dissonance-consonance. In addition, they form varieties of chord combinations and clusters, as well as varying levels of harmonic patterning.

== Scales ==
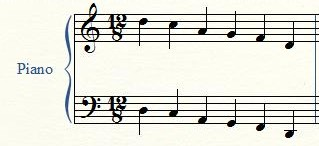
Anhemitonic pentatonic scale in descending order as conceptualized by African musicians

Chords are constructed from scales. Pentatonic and hexatonic scales are very common scales across Africa. Nonetheless, heptatonic scales can also be found in abundance. Anhemitonic scales, equal heptatonic scales, and scales based on the selected use of partials are used in Africa as well. The same community that may use one set of instruments tuned to a certain scale (i.e. pentatonic), can use a different scale for a different set of instruments, or song type (i.e. heptatonic).

In traditional African music, scales are practised and thought of as descending from top to bottom. African harmony is based on the scales being employed in a particular musical setting. Scales have a profound impact on the harmony because Africans modalize their music. Modalization is the process of applying modal concepts in a non-modal setting. African music uses recurring harmonic reference points as a means of musical organization. Therefore, African music is not modal or purely based on one mode. Nonetheless, modal concepts are employed in African music. This predates exposure to Western and Arab musics.

== Principles ==
=== Homophonic parallelism and homophonic polyphony ===
Homophonic parallelism in a Traditional African context. Rhythm is simplified in this example. Parallelism in this example is based on thirds.

Homophonic parallelism is the harmonizing of a single melody, or subordinate melody and moving with it in parallel. This means the notes that harmonize the melody follow its characteristic shape and rhythm. This type of parallelism is common to all African peoples, but the degree to which it is employed varies. Parallelism in thirds (inversely tenths), fourths, fifths, and octaves (inversely unison) are Pan-African methods of homophonic parallel harmonization. These intervals are interchanged depending on the melody they are accompanying and the scale source of the harmonization.

Homophonic polyphony occurs when two different melodies are harmonized in the style of homophonic parallelism, and either (1) occur simultaneously by means of overlapping antiphony or (2) over at the simultaneously as a result of melodic counterpoint.

This parallelism is not to be confused with strict parallelism. Gerhard Kubik states that much variation and freedom is permitted in parallel parts, with the stipulation that words remain intelligible (or in the case of instruments the melody remains recognizable), and the scalar source is observed. The harmonic line harmonized normally moves by step rarely jumping beyond a fourth.

"A.M. Jones states that 'generally speaking all over the continent south of the Sahara, African harmony is in organum and is sung either in parallel fourths, parallel fifths, parallel octaves or parallel thirds.' Parallelism, however, is not without limitations. Melodic and scale considerations, as has been shown, are of primary importance in deciding what notes are employed in harmonizing tunes and, consequently, what intervals are formed. The adaptation of parallelism to fit melodic requirements is much more apparent in the music of those areas of Africa where the pentatonic scale is the norm. Kirby has shown how the demands of a pentatonic scale result in the employment of sixths in Bantu polyphony, where parallelism in fifths is the principle. He points out that the limitations of the pentatonic scale make for the awareness of other intervals instead of what apparently was the strict duplication of the melody at the same interval employed by early European musicians."—Lazarus Ekweme

=== Secondary melody ===
The two measures on the left show the framework for chorus. This framework is the secondary melody that this chorus response is based on. The two measures on the right show the application of the span process in both the upward and downward direction on the secondary melody (counter melody). This example is in thirds.

The same secondary melody from the example above this time with the span process applied only in the upward direction.

The harmonization of a subordinate melody – be it responsorial or with regular repetitions within the cycle – is often based on a counter melody or secondary melody. From this melody the span process, pedal notes and other techniques can be used to for the harmony supporting the main melody.

Gerhard Kubik notes "In the Ijesha multipart singing style the basic chorus phrase, to which harmonically parallel lines may be added above and below, is the one in the middle, standing at the same pitch level with the leader's phrase...The basic chorus line is the one with which the chorus member singing alone would invariably link 'in unison' with the leader's phrase. as other chorus members join in, more voices are then added above and below in intervals perceived as consonant. These additional voices are essentially euphoric in concept; they are equivalent to a basic one, but are only collaterally dependent on the voice of the leader".

Lazarus Ekweme quotes J. H. Kwabena Nketia saying "In chorus response, there is primacy in the sense that one line is regarded as the basic melody. But the supporting line, by virtue of its running parallel to it, shares its characteristic progressions and is accordingly treated as a secondary melody. Indeed, when a cantor has to sing the chorus response, he may have the freedom of singing either of the two or of moving from one section to the other."

Secondary melody in this case refers to the voice harmonizing the chorus response. However, the chorus response is the secondary melody, which is harmonized. The harmonizing parts can vary just as the chorus response (or secondary melody) may vary. The added harmony part embellishes its own line as an independent melody, instead of following rigidly the intervocalic distance from the main chorus line in parallel movement.

The underlying concept is to create a melody and then a responsoral secondary melody. This secondary melodic line or phrase is then harmonized in parallel motion. The harmonic line harmonized normally moves by step rarely jumping beyond a fourth.

=== Ostinato-variation ===
Musical instruments in traditional African music often serve as a modal and/or rhythmic support for vocal music. Instrumental Music can also be heard frequently without vocal music and to a lesser extent solo. Harmony produced through ostinato produced on instruments is common place. These ostinati can be varied, or embellished, but otherwise provide modal support. Ostinato used in African music is a principal means of polyphony although other procedures for producing polyphony exist. Arom Simha states "music in the Central African Republic, regardless of the kind of polyphony or polyrhythm that is practiced, always involves the principle of ostinato with variations."

The principle of ostinato with variations is significant to African music and its polyphonic nature as most forms of traditional African polyphony are based on this principle. Simha continues "If one had to describe in a formula all the polyphonic and polyrhythmic procedures used in the Central African Republic, one might define them as ostinato (ostinati) with variations." The ostinato is normally used to create a modal pattern or background.

Arom Simha continues "This definition does not conflict with Western musicological definitions of the term. Thus Riemann defines ostinato as 'a technical term that describes the continual return of a theme surrounded by ever changing counterpoint [...] The great masters of the age of polyphony loved to write a whole mass or long motets on a single phrase constantly repeated by the tenor. But the repetitions are not always identical, and the little theme would appear in all sorts of modified forms' (Riemann 1931:953)."

Many African musics correspond exactly to this definition and are musical pieces based on a phrase, which reappears in varied and modified forms. These ostinato can be continuous or intermittent, vocal or instrumental, and may appear above or below the main line. Frequently in African music two or more ostinatos moving contrapuntally are employed, with or without a longer melodic line to create an orchestral texture (dense textures are desired and aimed for by both composers and performers alike). This type of polyphony is of the contrapuntal or horizontal type. In practice each ostinato moves in independent melodic and rhythmic patterns.

== Cadences and chord structures ==
Chords are normally formed using one of two techniques: the span process or scalar clusters. These chords can be embellished as a result of variation in which any combination of notes permitted by the scale can be used in a chord. However, in common practice, chords are formed by harmonizing in 3rds, 4ths, 5ths, 6ths, etc. The type of chord formed depends on the scale system being used.

Recent research has shown that African music has chord progressions. Gerhard Kubik states "until recently, little attention has been paid to a further structuring element, namely, the tonal-harmonic segmentation of a cycle. In most African music, cycles are sub-divided into two, four or eight tonal-harmonic segments." (A theory of African music, Volume II, page 44, paragraph 5).

In addition, the use of the tritone interval for tension is common in Africa. Oluwaseyi Kehinde notes "it is interesting that the interval of the tritone (augmented fourth or diminished fifth) is a salient feature in both vocal and instrumental music throughout Africa” (Karlton E. Hester and Francis Tovey use the same phrase to describe it). Gerhard Kubik in his article "bebop a case in point: the African matrix in Jazz harmonic practices" and his book "Africa and the Blues" echoes this point. This is significant to chords used as reference points or chord progressions in African musical structures.

Through the use of parallelism cadential patterns are inevitable. O.O. Bateye clarifies: "The subdominant (plagal) cadence is (resulting from the frequent tendency toward parallelism in African music) the favored cadence and not the perfect cadence, which is the norm in classical western music...Cadential patterns are frequent in African music and invariably result as a consequence of melodic movement either by thirds, fourths, or fifths – that is as a consequence of what may be referred to as shadow harmony ... A cadential descending minor third is frequently noted between the minor third step and the tonic (Reiser, 1982:122) in African music." These cadential movements are made using the melody and the scale as the guiding factor.

He continues "T.K. Philips objects to the te-doh and fah-me cadences as being authentic for African music, but nevertheless, as has been pointed out, are a frequent occurrence in African music utilizing scales other than the pentatonic. The presence of drones (see pedal notes below) is a common feature of African music."

=== "Target chords" ===
African music whose scalar source for the harmony is based on anhemtonic (every note is consonant with every other note) pentatonic and hexatonic scalar sources, Targeting specific vertical structures in relation to the secondary melodic phrase being harmonized is not a concern although this does happen.

For scalar systems that are not anhemtonic, target chords or vertical structures that are targeted for resolution are common place. Although the arrangement of the notes may be altered and/or embellished notes viewed as dissonant traditionally will be omitted from that structure. In harp music and xylophone music with 2 beaters these structures are dyads and are targeted for resolution by means of suspensions, anticipations, and other techniques of variation.

The "target chord" concept is applied equally to homomphonic parallelism and its various iterations as it is to polyphony. These vertical combinations by means of their strict repetition serve as an organizing structure to the improvised nature of the harmonic motions.

=== Polyphony ===
Polyphonic techniques used in African music include:

- Melodic counterpoint – related to homophony, however there is no predominant melodic line or no hierarchy among the parts. Although it is not a general rule, all the parts frequently observe the same rhythmic values.
- Polymelody – two different melodies with different start and end points occurring simultaneously.
- Ostinato-variation – variations on a theme with an onstinato or ostinati above or below the melody line.
- Hocket – interlocking, interweaving and overlapping rhythmic figures which are tiered on different pitches in a scalar system.
- Polyphony by polyrhythmics – Polyphony normally does not occur unless the melodies are rhythmically independent. When two African melodies occur at the same time and are rhythmically independent it is polyphony.
- Polyphony by inherent patterns – using auxiliary and passing note groups separated by disjunct intervals gives the facade of two melodies occurring back to back. This technique is used often by solo instrumentalists to create a pseudo-polyphony.

(Definitions Arom Simha)

== Techniques ==
Traditional African music often employs the following techniques to create harmony:

=== Span process ===
A chorus response in a heptatonic tradition. The use of the span process (or skipping process) results in the freedom of singers to add vocal parts. Here four part chord is used right before the final word of the chorus response. 3 and four part clusters are common in African music. However, their use is generally restricted by the number of singers available and type of scalar system being used for the song in question.

Span process applied to a hexatonic scalar system. The resulting chord combinations can be seen to the right.

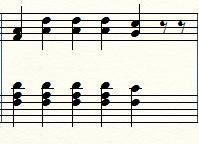
Triadic harmony in African music. This example is based on the pentatonic scale. Triads consisting of the intervals of a third and a fourth are just as common as those containing 2 intervals of a third. Triadic harmony is normal used to emphasize a point in the song text and/or melody.

Gerhard Kubik describes succinctly a process he attributes to the formation of chords used in parallelism throughout Africa. This process he calls the "span process". He states "The Span process or skipping process,(is) a structural principle implying that usually one note of a given scale is skipped by a second singer (or instrumental line) to obtain harmonic simultaneous sound in relation to the melodic line of a first vocalist (or instrumental line)". The harmonic line harmonized normally moves by step rarely jumping beyond a fourth.

=== Pedal notes ===
A frequent technique employed in African music (either as a means of variation or as part of a harmonic reference point) in which notes are repeated (on a monotone) in a part while others move in parallel motion above it. When there are at least 3 singers, the two or more upper parts follow the shape of the tune, while maintaining the intonation of the words, in parallel or similar motion. The lowest part repeats a basic drone (pedal notes can equally be found in higher voices as well). The repetitions may be temporary or extended depending on the performers and the particular musical piece. The employment of pedal notes is often the sources that oblique motion and contrary motion in African choral music. This technique is also applied to instrumental music.—Lazarus Ekwueme

Here a pedal note in the lowest voice is being employed. The harmony above moves in parallel within the scalar source for the harmony. In this case it is the pentatonic scale.

=== Rhythmic harmony ===
A chorus response in a heptatonic tradition. The use of the span process (or skipping process) results in the freedom of singers to add vocal parts. The use of four part harmony emphasizes the final parts of the chorus response. this is rhythmic harmony.

The use of harmony to enhance a rhythmic accent or to emphasize a note in the melody. these normally occur at the end of melodic phrases, but may take place anywhere it is desirable to accentuate a note or text in the melody.

=== Harmony by imitation ===
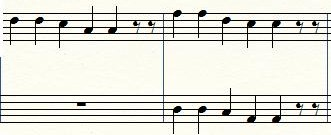
This is an example of Traditional African Harmony by imitation. The melody here plays a phrase in the first measure and sequences it melodically in the second measure. The second voice (in the bass clef) imitates the melody in the first measure. As a result, singing both the new phrase and original phase at once creates harmony between the parts. this harmony may be in parallel motion (as seen above) or it may be of a different type depending on the variations the melody makes on the original phrase.

This occurs when an added part imitates the shape of a portion of the melody (or other portion of the song) at a higher or lower pitch and after the initial musical phrase but overlapping with it. Due to tonal inflections (in the regions using tonal languages), the shape of the new musical phrase is similar to, but not necessarily identical with, that of the previous one. The use of imitation accounts for a wide variety of interval combinations within the scale system being used in African musics.

=== Scalar clusters ===
Scalar Clusters resulting from embellishments or ornamentation to reference points in xylophone music. Clusters themselves can be used deliberately as a reference point in a traditional African composition. This is a simplified version of 4 reference points embellished with other scale tones. The second measure shows the scalar source of the harmony. Due to variations and melodic concerns scalar clusters occur not only incidentally but at times are purposely aimed for by the musicians.

In parallel motion, rhythmic harmony or in harmonic patterns varying interval combinations can be found. However, all these intervals are limited to those permitted by the scale. The intervals of the second, third, fourth, fifth, sixth, seventh, octave, ninth and tenth can all be found. As African music and harmony is based on a cyclical structure with recurring reference points and harmonic reference points (or chords) some of these intervals are seen as color tones while others have structural significance. Generally the tones and intervals of structural significance are based on thirds, fourths, fifths, and octaves.

Simha states "In Central African polyphony, one can in fact find clusters of all the combinations of intervals allowed by the scale. The number of sounds included in vertical combinations varies with the number and type of performing instruments: while there are no more than two in Sanza music, it is not unusual to find four in xylophone music. In the limiting case, it can happen that the 5 sounds of the scale are simultaneously emitted as a cluster. This particular type of verticality can easily be explained by referring each sound comprising a 'chord' or sound cluster to its own melodic axis. It then becomes clear that the vertical configurations are the (partly fortuitous) consequence of the horizontal conception of melodic counterpoint."

This not only occurs when using pentatonic scales. Gerhard Kubik notes that the use of a partials derived system, or a Bordon system can also lead to the use of scalar clusters as consonance. In addition communities, and ethnic groups that use pentatonic systems many times also employ hexatonic and heptatonic scalar systems.

== Variation principle ==
The variation principle describes the process of altering, embellishing, and modifying of melodic, rhythmic, harmonic, and/or other parts of a musical structure. These variations are made within and/or around the role of the part being varied. These variations rarely break the function of the part to be varied. In African music these variations are often improvised. Variation in African music are abundant and the musicians view them as necessary. Simha Arom states, "All musical pieces are characterized by cyclic structure that generates numerous improvised variations: repetition and variation is one of the most fundamental principles of all Central African musics, as indeed of many other musics in Black Africa." He continues, "Finally, improvisation, which I have described as the driving force behind melodic and rhythmic variations, plays an important part in every group. But there is no such thing as free improvisation, that is, improvisation that does not refer back to some precise and identifiable piece of music. It is always subordinate to the musical structure in which it appears..."

Variation is a very important aspect in African music (and the musics of the African diaspora). At every level of music variation is expected, with the stipulation that the structure of the part being played is not compromised. Harmony is no exception. He explains: "Melodic and rhythmic variations can, however, affect the instrumental formula, just as they can appear in the song the formula supports and summarizes. These variations engender a large variety of vertical combinations, or consonances." Vertical combinations in African music have two different yet complementary functions. One function is that of being a structural reference point. The other is that of being an embellishment, or "color tone".

Arom Simha proceeds to note "We have already remarked that specific vertical combinations in each formula act as temporal reference points by virtue of their regular repetition at a given position in the periodic cycle. These combinations are the points at which several superposed melodic lines meet. They are usually based on octaves, fifths, and fourths, precisely the intervals which make up sections 1–4 of Chailley's resonance table (i960: 35), and this is certainly no accident. We may therefore assume that they take on a structural function." These vertical combinations that constitute reference points are chords that, together, form a chord progression. This is similar to the concepts of chords and progressions in cyclical forms in Jazz, Blues and other musics of the African diaspora.

Simha concludes "All other consonances can be viewed in the same way as the result of conjunctions of different melodies, but unlike the regularly repeated ones, their content (and at times even their position) is an arbitrary consequence of the numerous melodic and, particularly, rhythmic variations allowed in the various realizations of the formula. Consonances of this type seem intended to provide color, over and above the melodic nature of their constituent elements. This is a natural consequence of the fact that musicians tend to make full use of their available resources to enrich and variegate the texture of sound when performing cyclic music." These harmonic variations combined with rhythmic variations explain (in addition to the implementation of pedal notes) both "oblique" phenomena (anticipations and suspensions) and horizontal phenomena (drones and broken or ornamented pedal points).

David Locke in an article entitled "improvisation in west African music" states "...African musicians do improvise on various aspects of music, including melody, text, form, polyphony, rhythm, and timbre." These improvisations are based on preexisting musical structures and as such are variations and embellishments.

The Principles and techniques outlined above are all subject to variation not only by region, and the people, but also, by spontaneously improvised variations during performance. This creates complex harmonies. This is similar to the way Jazz musicians during a performance will alter a chord and embellish it with different "color tones", while still emphasizing principle chord tones so as not to disrupt the chord progression of the song.

Homophonic parallelism is also affected by this variation principle. With regards to improvised vocal parts within homophonic parallelism Gerhard Kubik in his book "Theory of African music", volume I says, "Another implicit concept of this multi-part musical system is linearity, i.e. each voice exists in its own right, though at the same time there remains the perspective of simultaneous vertical sound. All participants sing the same text, but their melodic lines are not parallel throughout, as might be expected from the tonal inflections of the language. on the contrary, oblique and counter-movement is consciously employed in order to emphasize the individuality of each participating voice. contrary motion is not always perceptible in recordings because the voices merge with one another. In practice an individual singer in the group can change the direction of his melodic line whenever he likes...An individual singer can also string up several variants of his voice part successively along the time-line. In 'chiyongoyongo' for instance, there are dozens of simultaneous variants possible and each are perceived as correct. this leads to a very lively style of variation, in which each individual voice is conceived to be linear and independent while contributing to the euphoric whole."

He continues "Where the precepts of tonal languages permit it (and this is the case in eastern Angola) we can thus find a kind of multi-part singing which transcends the "parallel harmony," so often described by authors as typical of one or the other African style. The multi-part singing style of the peoples of eastern Angola, including the Mbwela, Luchazi, Chokwe, Luvale and others is only parallel in theory. the creation of harmonic sound is accomplished within a relatively loose combination of individual voices, fluctuating between triads, bichords and more or less dense accumulations of notes. the exact shape of the chords, the duplication and omissions of individual notes in the total pattern may change with every repetition."

== Traditional African harmony as the basis for jazz and blues harmony ==
See:

- Gerhard Kubik's A case in point: Bebop: the African matrix in Jazz harmonic practices
- Gerhard Kubik's Africa and the Blues
- Gerhard Kubik's Theory of African Music volumes I and II
- David Locke's Improvisation in West Africa
- Karlton E. Hester's Bigotry and the Afrocentric “Jazz” Evolution
- Gunther Schuller Early Jazz, Its Roots and Musical Development

== See also ==
- Parallel harmony
- Polyphony
- Homophony
- Harmony
- Chords
- Chord progression
- Heterophony
- Countermelody
- Harmonization
- Improvisation
- Africa
- Quartal and quintal harmony
- Tertian
- Secundal
- Extended chord
- Jazz
- Mbube

== Sources ==
- Joseph Hanson Kwabena Nketia, The Music of Africa, W.W. Norton & Company, Inc., published 1974.
