= Dick Grove =

- Born: Richard Dean Grove; December 18, 1927; Lakeville, Indiana, U.S.
- Died: December 26, 1998 (aged 71) Laughlin, Nevada, U.S.
- Genres: Jazz
- Occupations: Educator, author, musician
- Instrument: Piano
- Years active: 1950s–1998

Richard Dean Grove (December 18, 1927 – December 26, 1998) was an American musician, composer, arranger, and educator. He is best known as the founder of the Dick Grove School of Music. Its students include Jerry Finn, Michael Jackson, Linda Ronstadt, Barry Manilow, Gary Stockdale, and Gary Meek. Its teachers included Henry Mancini, Bill Conti, and Lalo Schifrin.

== Biography ==
Richard Dean Grove was born in Lakeville, Indiana. At the University of Denver he studied music and then taught piano locally. In 1957 he moved to Los Angeles with Pinky Winters with whom he worked on gigs. He also taught at the Westlake School of Music. Westlake concentrated on the Schillinger System, which served as a basis for the first curricula at Berklee School of Music (which was called the Schillinger House of Music). In his Composing & Arranging Program, he mentions that he studied the Schillinger System for nine years.

Grove established the Dick Grove School of Music in Los Angeles in 1973. After the school closed in 1991, he established the Grove School Without Walls, a distance-learning school where he taught Musicianship and Modern Harmony, Composing and Arranging, and Jazz Keyboard via a series of books and accompanying videos and DVDs.

While operating the Grove School and the School without Walls, Grove published many books on musicianship, jazz harmony, ear training, improvisation, composing, and arranging as related to contemporary styles of music. He pioneered innovative concepts such as tying the study of chord symbols, jazz harmony and chord-scale-theory to ear training by using movable do solfege; the concept of chord families to organize all possible chords (including all extended chords); the concept of plural interior chords and "assumed roots" within a chord family, which is instrumental in systematically organizing slash chords, polychords, and "upper structure" voicings used in jazz; the "grid" concept, an expanded circle of fifths that helps to visualize, conceptualize, analyze and create chord progressions moving through different momentary keys according to criteria of good voice leading; the concept of "shapes" as a systematic approach to understanding voicings, and a comprehensive approach to jazz harmonization and reharmonization. He taught this through his Musicianship Program, Composing and Arranging Program, and Jazz Keyboard Program.. These distance learning programs came with Textbooks, Writing and Playing Assignments, Videos with Dick Grove explaining their content, and Play Along Tracks for Practicing the material. These materials are still available for purchase. The Grove School Without Walls is now run by Dirk Price and Dana Rasch.

As a jazz pianist, Grove worked with Alvino Rey, Paul Horn, Buddy Rich, and Nancy Wilson.
