= Eclecticism in music =

Use of diverse music genres

In music theory and music criticism, the term eclecticism can refer to the use of diverse music genres, instrumentation, and methods of composition and production.

Generic eclecticism denotes output ascribed to a range of genres, such as folk, rock, electronic, classical, jazz, by a single artist.

Eclectic musicians may also use historical references in their work. A song can refer to historical forms and methods through its composition, arrangement, or production.

== Classical theory ==
The term can be used to describe the music of composers who combine multiple styles of composition; an example would be a composer using a whole tone scale variant of a folk song in a pentatonic scale over a chromatic counterpoint, or a tertian arpeggiating melody over quartal or secundal harmonies.

Eclecticism can also occur through quotations, whether of a style, (Note: For example, Shostakovich's Symphony No. 9 calls back to Haydnesque classicism.) direct quotations of folk songs/variations of them—for example, in Mahler's Symphony No. 1—or direct quotations of other composers, for example in Berio's Sinfonia.

== See also ==
- Polystylism
- Progressive music

== Sources ==
- Kennedy, Michael, and Joyce Bourne (eds.). 2006. "Eclecticism", in The Oxford Dictionary of Music. Oxford and New York: Oxford University Press.
- Cope, David 1997. "Decategorization." Techniques of the Contemporary Composer,. New York: Schirmer Books; London: Prentice Hall International. ISBN 9780028647371.
