= So What chord =

Chord in jazz harmony

In jazz harmony, a So What chord is a particular 5-note chord voicing. From the bottom note upwards, it consists of three perfect fourth intervals followed by a major third interval. It was employed by Bill Evans in the "'amen' response figure" to the head of the Miles Davis tune "So What".

For example, an "E minor" So What chord is an Em^{11} voicing:

The So What chord is often used as an alternative to quartal voicings and may be used in diatonic and chromatic planing. It is identical to the standard tuning of a guitar's five lowest strings. It is essentially a minor eleventh chord, arranged as it would be played on a guitar (1, 4, ♭7, ♭3, 5).

It may also be thought of as a five-note quartal chord (built from fourths) with the top note lowered by a semitone. More modern sounding than "tertial chords" (built from thirds), it is useful in comping; since the structure of quartal harmony is usually vague, many roots may be applied to the So What chord and it may work well in various contexts including, "a major scale context; a Mixolydian mode context; or a minor context". For example, without changing the keys that are played, the same Em^{11} chord described above can also function as a C6^{Δ9}, Asus4^{7(9)}, G6^{9}, Dsus2^{4, 6 [no 7]}, F^{lydian} (FΔ9♯11^{13 [no 5]}) or F♯^{phrygian} (F♯m7♭9^{11♭13 [no 5]}).

Other jazz recordings that make extensive use of the chord include McCoy Tyner's "Peresina" and Gary Burton's "Gentle Wind and Falling Tear". Tyner's use of similar voicings was an early influence on Chick Corea; it can be heard in tunes such as "Steps" and "Matrix" (both featured on his landmark album Now He Sings, Now He Sobs).

The term "So What chord" is used extensively in Mark Levine's landmark work The Jazz Piano Book, wherein he describes a range of uses for which the voicing might be employed. Frank Mantooth dedicated two chapters to the chord under the name "Miracle voicing" in his work Voicings for Jazz Keyboard.
