= Walkdown =

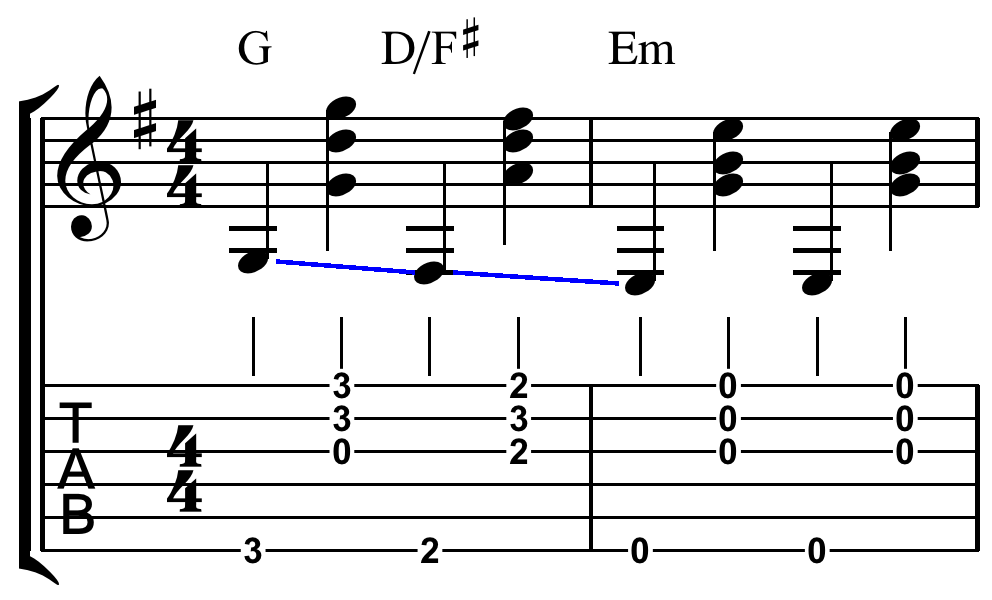
Country walkdown, in blue, with Carter Family picking.

In country music, walkdown is a bassline which connects two root position chords whose roots are a third apart, often featuring an inverted chord to go between the root notes of the first two chords. See: slash chord. A walkup would be the converse. For example, the chords G major and E minor (a minor third apart) may be joined by an intervening chord to create stepwise motion in the bass: G-D/F♯-Em (I-V6-vi). The second chord, D major, is performed with its third note, the F#, in the bass. Walkdowns may be performed by the upright bass player, the electric bass player, the guitarist, or a piano player.

In jazz, a walkdown is a descending bassline below chords sharing a common tone. For example, if the above was G-D/F♯-Em7 the bassline would descend, G, F♯, E, while D is held in common. Walkdown may also refer to the movement from V to IV in bars nine and ten of the twelve-bar blues.

== See also ==
- Walking bass
