= William Weaver (disambiguation) =

William Weaver (1923–2013) was an English language translator.

Will or William Weaver may also refer to:

- Will Weaver (born 1950), American writer
- Will Weaver (basketball) (born c. 1984), American basketball coach
- William J. Weaver (1759–1817), British-American portrait painter
- William Woys Weaver (born 1947), American culinary historian and heirloom plant scholar
- William Weaver Austin (1920–2000), American musicologist, organist, and pianist
- William Weaver Bennett (1841–1912), First Mayor of Teaneck, New Jersey
- William Weaver Tomlinson (1858–1916), English historian
- William B. "Farmer" Weaver (1865-1943), American baseball player and criminal

== See also ==
- William Weaver House
