= Quartal and quintal harmony =

Types of harmonic structures in music

In music, quartal harmony is the building of harmonic structures from the intervals of the perfect fourth, the augmented fourth, and the diminished fourth. For instance, a three-note quartal chord on C can be built by stacking perfect fourths, C–F–B♭.

Quintal harmony is harmonic structure preferring the perfect fifth, the augmented fifth and the diminished fifth. For instance, a three-note quintal chord on C can be built by stacking perfect fifths, C–G–D.

== Properties ==
Notes in a quartal chord on A can be arranged to form a thirteenth chord on B♭.

The terms quartal and quintal imply a contrast, either compositional or perceptual, with traditional harmonic constructions based on thirds: listeners familiar with music of the common practice period are guided by tonalities constructed with familiar elements: the chords that make up major and minor scales, all in turn built from major and minor thirds.

Regarding chords built from perfect fourths alone, composer Vincent Persichetti writes that:

Chords by perfect fourth are ambiguous in that, like all chords built by equidistant intervals (diminished seventh chords or augmented triads), any member can function as the root. The indifference of this rootless harmony to tonality places the burden of key verification upon the voice with the most active melodic line.

Quintal harmony (the harmonic layering of fifths specifically) is a lesser-used term, and since the fifth is the inversion or complement of the fourth, it is usually considered indistinct from quartal harmony. Because of this relationship, any quartal chord can be rewritten as a quintal chord by changing the order of its pitches.

Like tertian chords, a given quartal or quintal chord can be written with different voicings, some of which obscure its quartal structure. For instance, the quartal chord, C–F–B♭, can be written as

== History ==
In the Middle Ages, simultaneous notes a fourth apart were heard as a consonance. During the common practice period (between about 1600 and 1900), this interval came to be heard either as a dissonance (when appearing as a suspension requiring resolution in the voice leading) or as a consonance (when the root of the chord appears in parts higher than the fifth of the chord). In the later 19th century, during the breakdown of tonality in classical music, all intervallic relationships were once again reassessed. Quartal harmony was developed in the early 20th century as a result of this breakdown and reevaluation of tonality.

=== Precursors ===
The Tristan chord is made up of the notes F♮, B♮, D♯ and G♯ and is the first chord heard in Wagner's opera Tristan und Isolde.

The bottom two notes make up an augmented fourth, while the upper two make up a perfect fourth. This layering of fourths in this context has been seen as highly significant. The chord had been found in earlier works, notably Beethoven's Piano Sonata No. 18, but Wagner's use was significant, first because it is seen as moving away from traditional tonal harmony and even towards atonality, and second because with this chord Wagner actually provoked the sound or structure of musical harmony to become more predominant than its function, a notion which was soon after to be explored by Debussy and others.

Despite the layering of fourths, it is rare to find musicologists identifying this chord as "quartal harmony" or even as "proto-quartal harmony", since Wagner's musical language is still essentially built on thirds, and even an ordinary dominant seventh chord can be laid out as augmented fourth plus perfect fourth (F–B–D–G). Wagner's unusual chord is really a device to draw the listener into the musical-dramatic argument which the composer is presenting to us.

At the beginning of the 20th century, quartal harmony finally became an important element of harmony. Scriabin used a self-developed system of transposition using fourth-chords, like his Mystic chord (shown below) in his Piano Sonata No. 6.

Scriabin wrote this chord in his sketches alongside other quartal passages and more traditional tertian passages, often passing between systems, for example widening the six-note quartal sonority (C–F♯–B♭–E–A–D) into a seven-note chord (C–F♯–B♭–E–A–D–G). Scriabin's sketches for his unfinished work Mysterium show that he intended to develop the Mystic chord into a huge chord incorporating all twelve notes of the chromatic scale.

In France, Erik Satie experimented with planing in the stacked fourths (not all perfect) of his 1891 score for Le Fils des étoiles. Paul Dukas's The Sorcerer's Apprentice (1897) has a rising repetition in fourths, as the tireless work of out-of-control walking brooms causes the water level in the house to "rise and rise".

=== 20th- and 21st-century classical music ===
Composers who use the techniques of quartal harmony include Claude Debussy, Francis Poulenc, Alexander Scriabin, Alban Berg, Leonard Bernstein, Arnold Schoenberg, Igor Stravinsky, Maurice Ravel, Sigfrid Karg-Elert, Joe Hisaishi and Anton Webern.

==== Schoenberg ====
Arnold Schoenberg's Chamber Symphony Op. 9 (1906) displays quartal harmony: the first measure and a half construct a five-part fourth chord with the notes (highlighted in red in the illustration) A–D♯–F–B♭–E♭–A♭ distributed over the five stringed instruments (the viola must tune down the lowest string by a minor third, and read in the unfamiliar tenor clef).

Vertical quartal-harmony in the string parts of the opening measures of Arnold Schoenberg's Chamber Symphony Op. 9

Six-note horizontal fourth chord in Arnold Schoenberg's Chamber Symphony Op. 9

Schoenberg was also one of the first to write on the theoretical consequences of this harmonic innovation. In his Theory of Harmony (Harmonielehre) of 1911, he wrote:

The construction of chords by superimposing fourths can lead to a chord that contains all the twelve notes of the chromatic scale; hence, such construction does manifest a possibility for dealing systematically with those harmonic phenomena that already exist in the works of some of us: seven, eight, nine, ten, eleven, and twelve-part chords… But the quartal construction makes possible, as I said, accommodation of all phenomena of harmony.

For Anton Webern, the importance of quartal harmony lay in the possibility of building new sounds. After hearing Schoenberg's Chamber Symphony, Webern wrote "You must write something like that, too!"

==== Others ====
In his Theory of Harmony: "Besides myself my students Dr. Anton Webern and Alban Berg have written these harmonies (fourth chords), but also the Hungarian Béla Bartók or the Viennese Franz Schreker, who both go a similar way to Debussy, Dukas and perhaps also Puccini, are not far off."

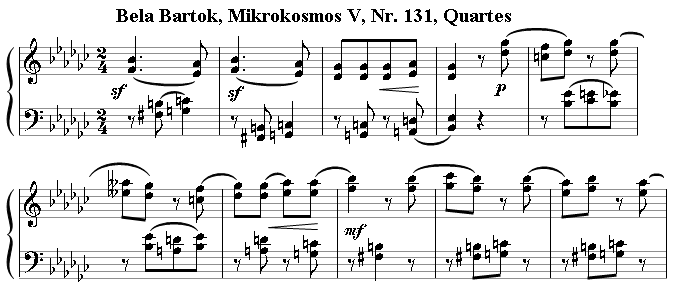
Fourths in Béla Bartók's Mikrokosmos V, No. 131, Fourths (Quartes)

French composer Maurice Ravel used quartal chords in Sonatine (1906) and Ma mère l'Oye (1910), while American Charles Ives used quartal chords in his song "The Cage" (1906).

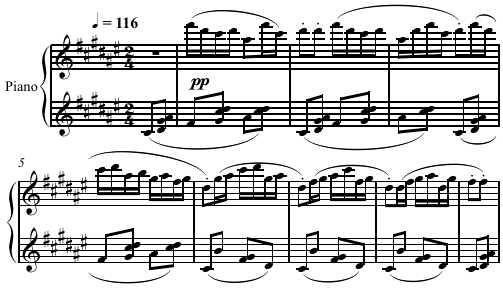
Quartal harmony in "Laideronnette" from Ravel's Ma mère l'Oye. The top line uses the pentatonic scale

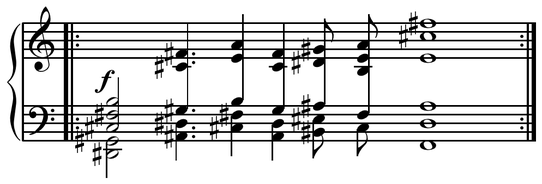
Introduction to Charles Ives's "The Cage" from 114 Songs

Hindemith constructed large parts of his symphonic work Symphony: Mathis der Maler by means of fourth and fifth intervals. These steps are a restructuring of fourth chords (C–D–G becomes the fourth chord D–G–C), or other mixtures of fourths and fifths (D♯–A♯–D♯–G♯–C♯ in measure 3 of the example).

Hindemith was, however, not a proponent of an explicit quartal harmony. In his 1937 writing Unterweisung im Tonsatz (The Craft of Musical Composition,Hindemith 1937) he wrote that "notes have a family of relationships, that are the bindings of tonality, in which the ranking of intervals is unambiguous," so much so, indeed, that in the art of triadic composition "...the musician is bound by this, as the painter to his primary colours, the architect to the three dimensions." He lined up the harmonic and melodic aspects of music in a row in which the octave ranks first, then the fifth and the third, and then the fourth. "The strongest and most unique harmonic interval after the octave is the fifth, the prettiest nevertheless is the third by right of the chordal effects of its Combination tones."

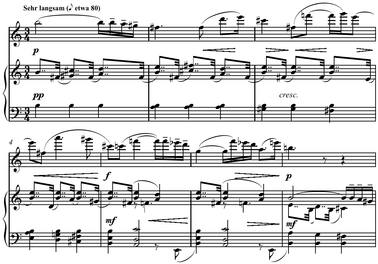
Quartal harmony in Hindemith's Flute Sonata, II with tonal center on B established by descent in left hand in Dorian and repeated B's and F♯'s

The works of the Filipino composer Eliseo M. Pajaro (1915–1984) are characterised by quartal and quintal harmonies, as well as by dissonant counterpoint and polychords.

As a transition to the history of jazz, George Gershwin may be mentioned. In the first movement of his Concerto in F altered fourth chords descend chromatically in the right hand with a chromatic scale leading upward in the left hand.

=== Jazz ===
"Edinburgh in August"
In Adam Cuerden's "Edinburgh in August", the opening section is made up entirely of quartal chords, which also appear frequently in the piece.

Jazz is often understood as a synthesis of the European common practice harmonic vocabulary with textural paradigms from West African folk music—but it would be an oversimplification to describe jazz as sharing the same fundamental theory of harmony as European music. Important influences come from opera as well as from the instrumental work of Classical- and Romantic-era composers, and even that of the Impressionists. From the beginning, jazz musicians expressed a particular interest in rich harmonic colours, for which non-tertiary harmony was a means of exploration, as used by pianists and arrangers like Jelly Roll Morton, Duke Ellington, Art Tatum, Bill Evans, Milt Buckner, Chick Corea, Herbie Hancock, and especially McCoy Tyner.

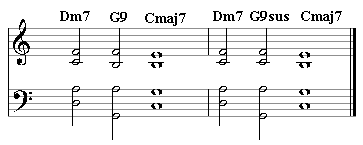
ii–V–I cadencefourth-suspension or sus chord

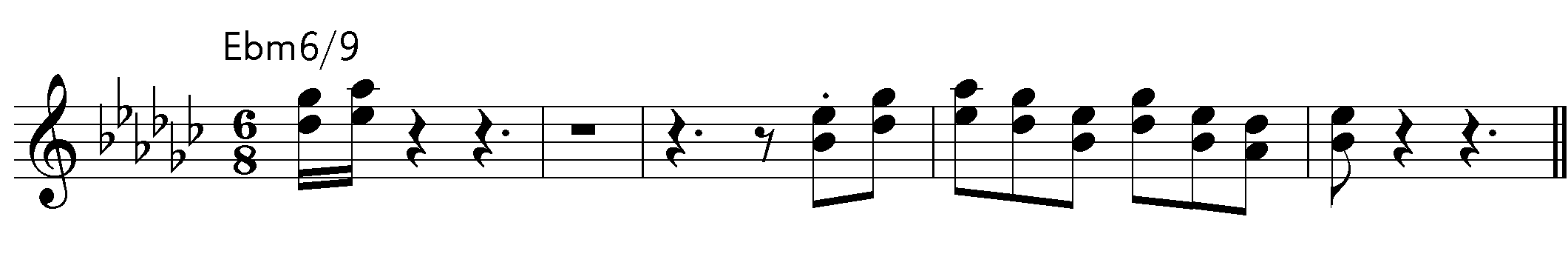
Typical hard bop brass part, from Horace Silver's "Señor Blues"

The hard bop of the 1950s made new applications of quartal harmony accessible to jazz. Quintet writing in which two melodic instruments (commonly trumpet and saxophone) may proceed in fourths, while the piano (as a uniquely harmonic instrument) lays down chords, but sparsely, only hinting at the intended harmony. This style of writing, in contrast with that of the previous decade, preferred a moderate tempo. Thin-sounding unison bebop horn sections occur frequently, but these are balanced by bouts of very refined polyphony such as is found in cool jazz.

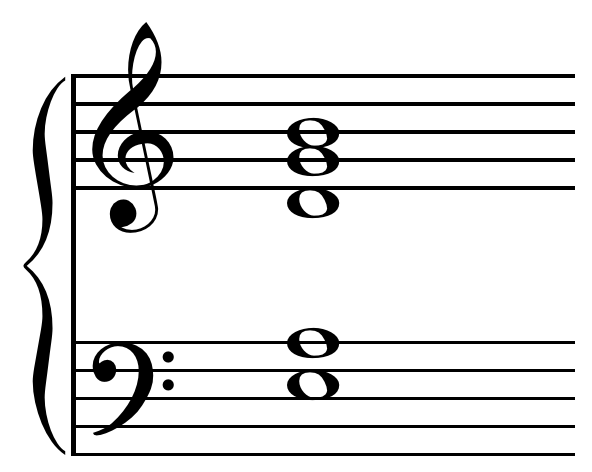
The "So What" chord uses three intervals of a fourth.

On his watershed record Kind of Blue, Miles Davis with pianist Bill Evans used a chord consisting of three perfect fourth intervals and a major third on the composition "So What". This particular voicing is sometimes referred to as a So What chord, and can be analyzed (without regard for added sixths, ninths, etc.) as a minor seventh with the root on the bottom, or as a major seventh with the third on the bottom.

From the outset of the 1960s, the employment of quartal possibilities had become so familiar that the musician now felt the fourth chord existed as a separate entity, self standing and free of any need to resolve. The pioneering of quartal writing in later jazz and rock, like the pianist McCoy Tyner's work with saxophonist John Coltrane's "classic quartet", was influential throughout this epoch. Oliver Nelson was also known for his use of fourth chord voicings. Tom Floyd claims that the "foundation of 'modern quartal harmony'" began in the era when the Charlie Parker–influenced John Coltrane added classically trained pianists Bill Evans and McCoy Tyner to his ensemble.

Jazz guitarists cited as using chord voicings using quartal harmony include Johnny Smith, Tal Farlow, Chuck Wayne, Barney Kessel, Joe Pass, Jimmy Raney, Wes Montgomery—however, all in a traditional manner, as major 9th, 13th and minor 11th chords (an octave and fourth equals an 11th). Jazz guitarists cited as using modern quartal harmony include Jim Hall (especially Sonny Rollins's The Bridge), George Benson ("Sky Dive"), Pat Martino, Jack Wilkins ("Windows"), Joe Diorio, Howard Roberts, Kenny Burrell, Wes Montgomery, Henry Johnson, Russell Malone, Jimmy Bruno, Howard Alden, Bill Frisell, Paul Bollenback, Mark Whitfield, and Rodney Jones.

Quartal harmony was also explored as a possibility under new experimental scale models as they were "discovered" by jazz. Musicians began to work extensively with the so-called church modes of old European music, and they became firmly situated in their compositional process. Jazz was well-suited to incorporate the medieval use of fourths to thicken lines into its improvisation. The pianists Herbie Hancock, and Chick Corea are two musicians well known for their modal experimentation. Around this time, a style known as free jazz also came into being, in which quartal harmony had extensive use, owing to the wandering nature of its harmony.

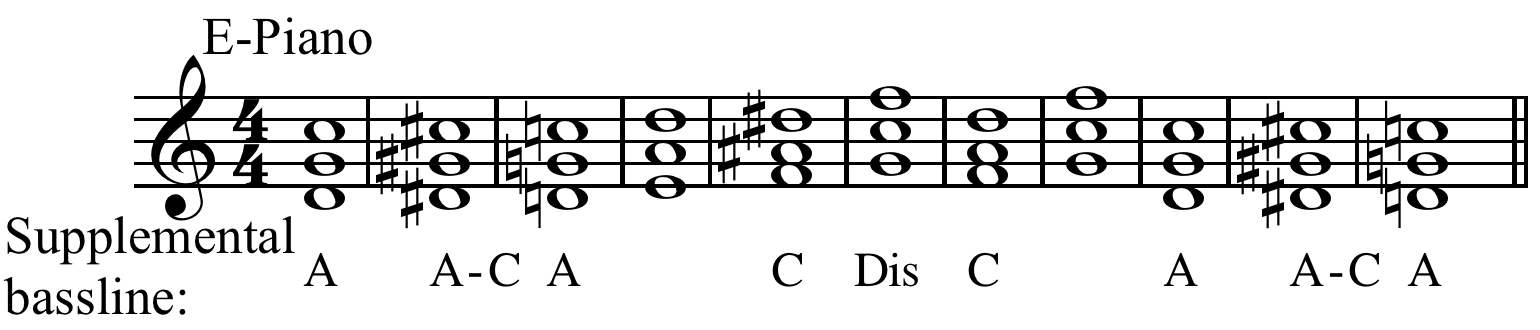
Fourths in Herbie Hancock's "Maiden Voyage"

In jazz, the way chords were built from a scale came to be called voicing, and specifically quartal harmony was referred to as fourth voicing.

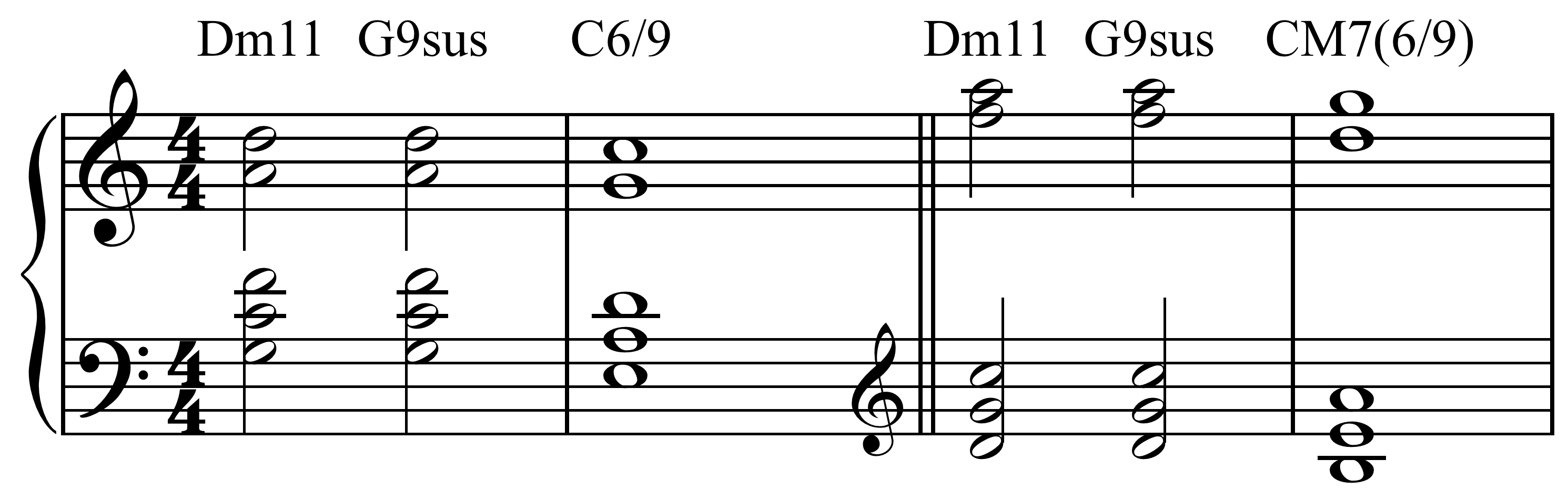
ii–V–I turnaround with fourth voicings: all chords are in fourth voicings. They are often ambiguous as, for example, the Dm11 and G9sus chords are here voiced identically and will thus be distinguished for the listener by the root movement of the bassist.

Thus when the m11 and the dominant 7th sus (9sus above) chords in quartal voicings are used together they tend to "blend into one overall sound" sometimes referred to as modal voicings, and both may be applied where the m11 chord is called for during extended periods such as the entire chorus.

=== Rock music ===
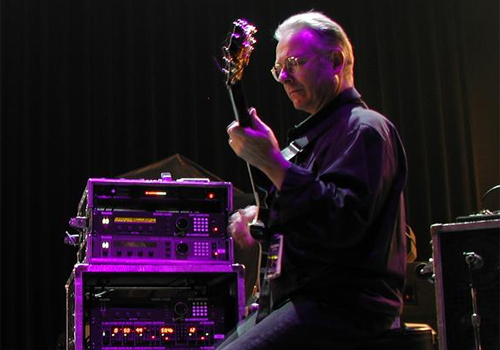
Disliking the sound of thirds (in equal-temperament tuning), Robert Fripp builds chords with perfect intervals in his new standard tuning.

Quartal and quintal harmony have been used by Robert Fripp, guitarist of King Crimson. Fripp dislikes minor thirds and especially major thirds in equal temperament tuning, which is used by non-experimental guitars. The perfect fourths and fifths of just intonation are well approximated in equal temperament tuning, and perfect fifths and octaves are highly consonant intervals. Fripp builds chords using perfect fifths, fourths, and octaves in his new standard tuning (NST), a regular tuning having perfect fifths between its successive open strings.

The 1971 album Tarkus by Emerson, Lake & Palmer depends on quartal harmony throughout, including a recurrent elaboration on the classical Alberti bass pattern, in this case consisting of three broken quartal three-note chords, the first two of which are also a perfect fourth apart, and the third a semitone higher than the first. Keith Emerson uses programmatic quintal harmony in several places for extended rapid obbligato passages where human fingering would be impracticable, the first on Hammond organ and the second on Modular Moog, in a similar manner to the mutation stops on pipe organs, such as the "Twelfth" at 2 2/3' pitch played against a 4' "Principal" (which plays the eighth note). In the second instance, the triad is both quartal and quintal, being 1+4+5.

Ray Manzarek of The Doors was another keyboard player and composer who put classical and jazz elements, including quartal harmonies, into the service of rock music. The keyboard solo of "Riders on the Storm", for instance, has several passages where the melody line is doubled at an interval of a perfect fourth, and extensive use of (E dorian) minor chord voicings featuring the seven and three, spaced by that same interval, as the prominent notes.

== Examples of quartal pieces ==
=== Classical ===
- William Albright
  Sonata for Alto Saxophone and Piano
- Alban Berg
  Sonata for Piano, Op. 1
  Wozzeck
- Carlos Chávez
  Sinfonía de Antígona (Symphony No. 1), uses quartal harmony throughout
  Sinfonía india (Symphony No. 2), the A-minor Sonora melody beginning in b. 183 is accompanied by quartal harmonies
- Aaron Copland
  Of Mice and Men

Parallel fourths evoking organum in Debussy's La cathédrale engloutie opening

- Claude Debussy
  "La cathédrale engloutie", beginning and ending
- Norman Dello Joio
  Suite for Piano
- Caspar Diethelm
  Piano Sonata No. 7
- Alberto Ginastera
  12 American Preludes, Prelude #7
- Carlos Guastavino
  "Donde habite el olvido"
- Howard Hanson
  Symphony No. 2 ("Romantic")
- Walter Hartley
  Bacchanalia for Band
- Charles Ives
  "The Cage" (1906)
  Central Park in the Dark
  "Harpalus"
  Psalm 24, verse 5
  Psalm 90
  "Walking"
- Aram Khachaturian
  Toccata
- Benjamin Lees
  String Quartet No. 2, Adagio
- Darius Milhaud
  Sonatina for flute & piano, Op. 76
- Walter Piston
  Clarinet Concerto
  Ricercare for Orchestra
- Einojuhani Rautavaara
  "Kvartit" (Fourths), Op. 42, Études (Rautavaara)
- Maurice Ravel
  Ma mère l'oye : "Mouvt de Marche" of "Laideronnette"
- Ned Rorem
  King Midas, cantata
- Erik Satie
  Le Fils des étoiles
- Arnold Schoenberg
  The Book of the Hanging Gardens
  Chamber Symphony, Op. 9) slow section, b. 1–3
  Wind Quintet, Op. 26
- Cyril Scott
  Diatonic Study (1914)
- Nikos Skalkottas
  Suite No. 3 for Piano
- Stephen Sondheim
  Piano Sonata
- Karlheinz Stockhausen
  Klavierstück IX
- Howard Swanson
  "Saw a Grave"
- Heitor Villa-Lobos
  Nonet (1923)
- Anton Webern
  Variations for Piano, Op. 27
- John Williams
  Star Wars - Main Title (1977)
  Superman - Main Title (1978)

=== Jazz ===
- Miles Davis
  Kind of Blue
- Herbie Hancock
  "Maiden Voyage"
- Eddie Harris
  "Freedom Jazz Dance"
- McCoy Tyner
  "Contemplation"
  "Passion Dance"
- John Coltrane
  "A Love Supreme: Part 1: "Acknowledgement"
- Joe Henderson
  "Mode for Joe", from Mode for Joe
  "In N' Out"
- Walter Bishop Jr.
  "Those Who Chant", from Keeper of My Soul

=== Folk ===
On her 1968 debut album Song to a Seagull, Joni Mitchell used quartal and quintal harmony in "Dawntreader", and she used quintal harmony in the title track Song to a Seagull.

=== Rock ===
- Emerson, Lake & Palmer
  Tarkus
- Frank Zappa
  "Zoot Allures"
  "Inca Roads" "Approximate"
- XTC
  "Rook" (composed by Andy Partridge, from the album Nonsuch)

== See also ==
- Secundal
- Polychord
- Viennese trichord
- Traditional sub-Saharan African harmony
