= Upper structure =

Voicing approach in jazz

In jazz, the term upper structure or "upper structure triad" refers to a voicing approach developed by jazz pianists and arrangers defined by the sounding of a major or minor triad in the uppermost pitches of a more complex harmony.

== Examples ==
=== Example 1 ===
Below, a common voicing used by jazz pianists is given for the chord C^{7♯9}. Note that the root C is omitted here, and is often done so by jazz pianists for ease of playing, or because a bass player is present.

In the lower staff, the notes E and B♭ are given, forming a tritone which defines the dominant sound and are the major third and minor seventh of the C^{7♯9} chord. In the upper staff, the notes E♭, G, and B♭ are given together, which form an E♭ major triad. This E♭ major triad is what would be called the upper structure. Considered in relation to the root C, the notes of this E♭ major-triad function, respectively, as the sharp ninth (the root of the E♭ major chord), fifth, and seventh in relation to that root.

=== Example 2 ===
The following example illustrates the notes of an F♯ minor triad functioning as part of a C^{13♭9♯11} chord :

In relation to the root of C, the C♯ (enharmonic with D♭) functions as the minor ninth, the F♯ as the augmented eleventh, and the A as the major thirteenth, respectively.

== Application ==
Determining which additional pitches can be juxtaposed with the chord is achieved by considering the relationship between a particular chord and the scale it implies. An example follows:

1. The chord C^{13♭9♯11} contains the following notes, from the root upwards: C, E, G, B♭, D♭, F♯, A;
2. The following diminished scale contains all of these pitches, and fits/matches up with the C^{13♭9♯11} chord: C–D♭–D♯–E–F♯–G–A–B♭–C; these scale elements form a pool from which melodic and harmonic devices might be devised.

== Shorthand notation ==
Common jazz parlance refers to upper structures by way of the interval between the root of the bottom chord and the root of the triad juxtaposed above it. For instance, in example one above (C^{7♯9}) the triad of E♭ major is a (compound) minor 3rd away from C (root of the bottom chord). Thus, this upper structure can be called upper structure flat three, or US♭III for short.

Other possible upper structures are:

- USII – e.g. D major over C^{7}, resulting in C^{13♯11}
- US♭V – e.g. G♭ major over C^{7}, resulting in C^{7♭9♯11}
- US♭VI – e.g. A♭ major over C^{7}, resulting in C^{7♯9♭13}
- USVI – e.g. A major over C^{7}, resulting in C^{13♭9}
- USi – e.g. C minor over C^{7}, resulting in C^{7♯9}
- US♭ii – e.g. D♭ minor over C^{7}, resulting in C^{7♭9♭13}
- US♭iii – e.g. E♭ minor over C^{7}, resulting in C^{7♯9♯11}

The second item in the list above (C^{7♭9♯11}) has a related version called upper structure sharp four minor--with the written shorthand US♯iv--created with an F♯ minor triad. (See "Example 2" above.)

== See also ==
- Extended harmony
- Jazz chord
- Jazz scales
- Polychord
- Chordioid
