= Blind octave =

Music composition and performance technique

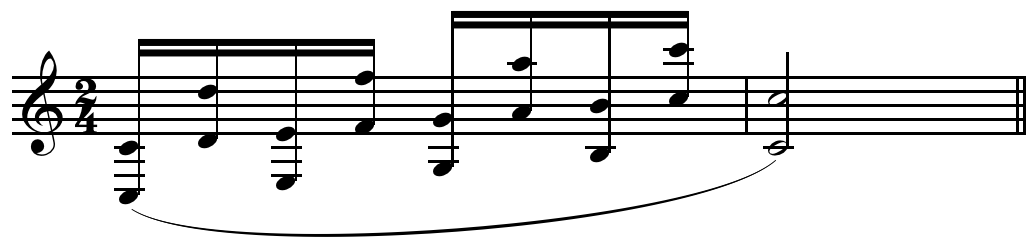
Blind octave passage on C major scale. Blind octave passage B

In music, a blind octave is the alternate doubling above and below a successive scale or trill notes: "the passage being played...alternately in the higher and lower octave." According to Grove's Dictionary of Music and Musicians, the device is not to be introduced into the works of "older composers" (presumably those preceding Liszt).

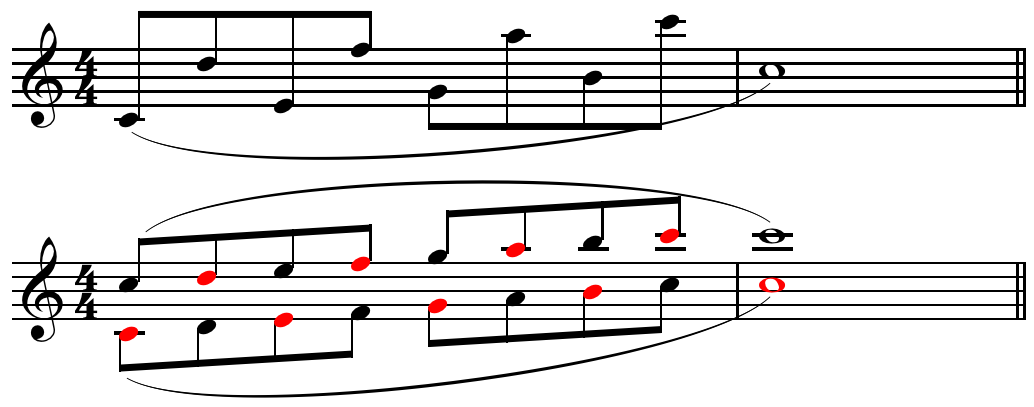
Blind octave passage on C major scale followed regular two octave passage (with blind octave notes in red). Blind octave passage

Alternately, a blind octave may occur "in a rapid octave passage when one note of each alternate octave is omitted." The effect is to simulate octave doubling using a solo instrument.
