= Secundal =

Example of piano tone clusters creating secundal chords, especially in the left hand (bottom) part, which features three notes each a second apart.

In music or music theory, secundal is the quality of a chord made from seconds, and anything related to things constructed from seconds such as counterpoint. Secundal chords are often called tone clusters more generally, especially when non-diatonic. "[Any] three or more pitches in secundal relationship may correctly be referred to as a tone cluster." Chords which may be considered as built from sevenths, because of musical inversion, are secundal. Polychords may create secundal chords.

The secundal harmony in Ross Lee Finney's "Playing Tag" provides "accentuation and forward motion", as well as the basis for the "fragmentary melody":

Secundal harmony in Ross Lee Finney's "Playing Tag".

== See also ==
- Tertian
- Quartal
- Polychord
