= Tertian =

Harmonic structures constructed from intervals of thirds

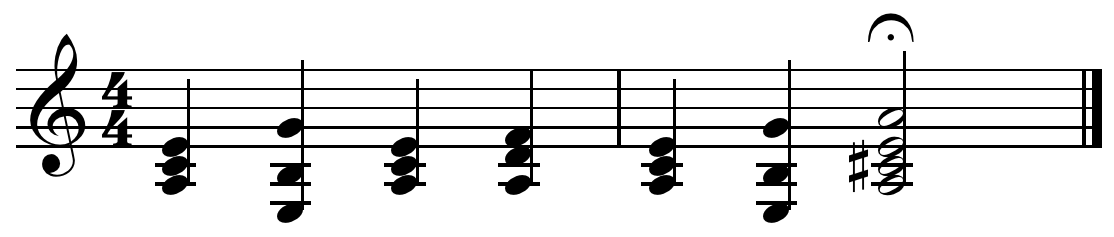
A chord progression of tertian chords in A minor (i–v–i–iv${}^6_4$–i–v–I) ending on a Picardy third

In music theory, tertian (Latin: tertianus, "of or concerning thirds") describes any piece, chord, counterpoint etc. constructed from the intervals of (major and minor) thirds. Tertian harmony (also called triadic harmony) principally uses chords based on thirds. The term is typically used to contrast with alternatives, like quartal and quintal harmony, which use chords based on fourths or fifths.

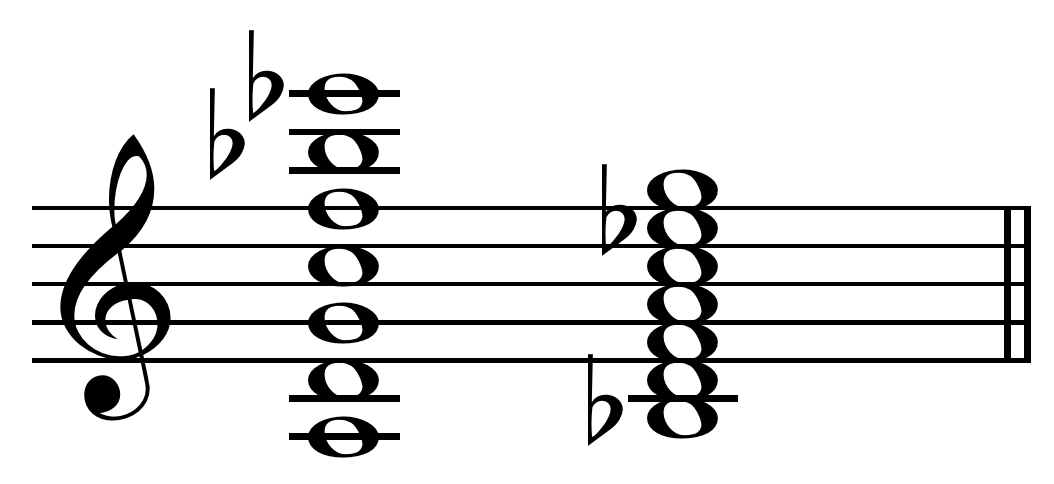
Quartal chord on A equals thirteenth chord on B♭, distinguished by the arrangement of chord factors.

A traditional triad can be regarded as consisting of a stack of two consecutive thirds. This allows for four permutations, each producing a chord with distinct quality.

Quality of Third		Resulting Chord Quality
1st	2nd	Resulting Chord Quality
major	minor	major
minor	major	minor
major	major	augmented
minor	minor	diminished

A musical scale may also be analyzed as a succession of thirds.

The meantone temperament, a system of tuning that emphasizes pure thirds, may be called "tertian".

Chords built from sixths may also be referred to as tertian because sixths are equivalent to thirds when inverted, and vice versa: any sixth can be taken as the inversion of a third. For instance, the interval C–A is a major sixth that, when inverted, gives the interval A–C, which is a minor third.

Tertian root movements have been used innovatively in chord progressions as an alternative to root motion in fifths, as for example in the thirds cycle used in John Coltrane's Coltrane changes, as influenced by Nicolas Slonimsky's Thesaurus of Scales and Melodic Patterns.

== See also ==
- Major and minor
- Mediant and submediant
- Secundal
- Quartal
- Polychord
