= Slash chord =

Chord whose bass note is indicated by a slash

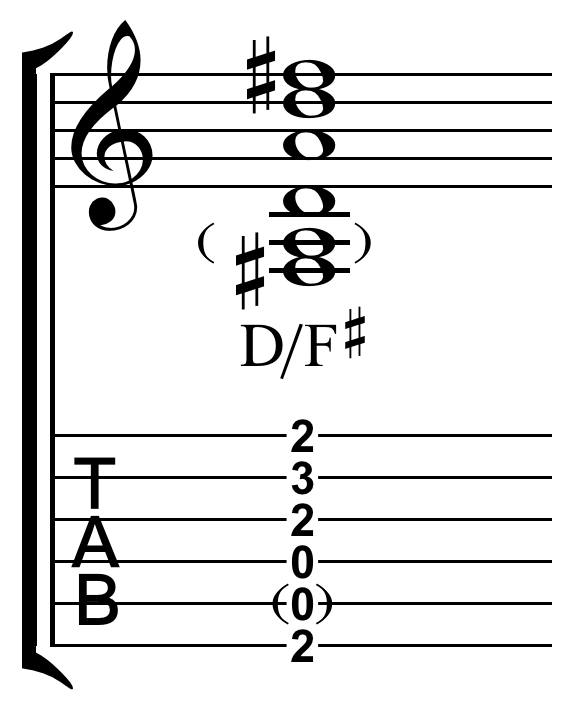
D/F♯(alternately notated D major/F♯ bass) notated in regular notation (on top) and tabulature (below) for a six-string guitar..

In music, especially modern popular music, a slash chord or slashed chord, also compound chord, is a chord whose bass note or inversion is indicated by the addition of a slash and the letter of the bass note after the root note letter. It does not indicate "or". For example, a C major chord (C) in second inversion is written C/G or C/G bass, which reads "C slash G", "C over G" or "C over a G bass". Some chords may not otherwise be notated, such as A♭/A. Thus, a slash chord may also indicate the chord form or shape and an additional bass note.

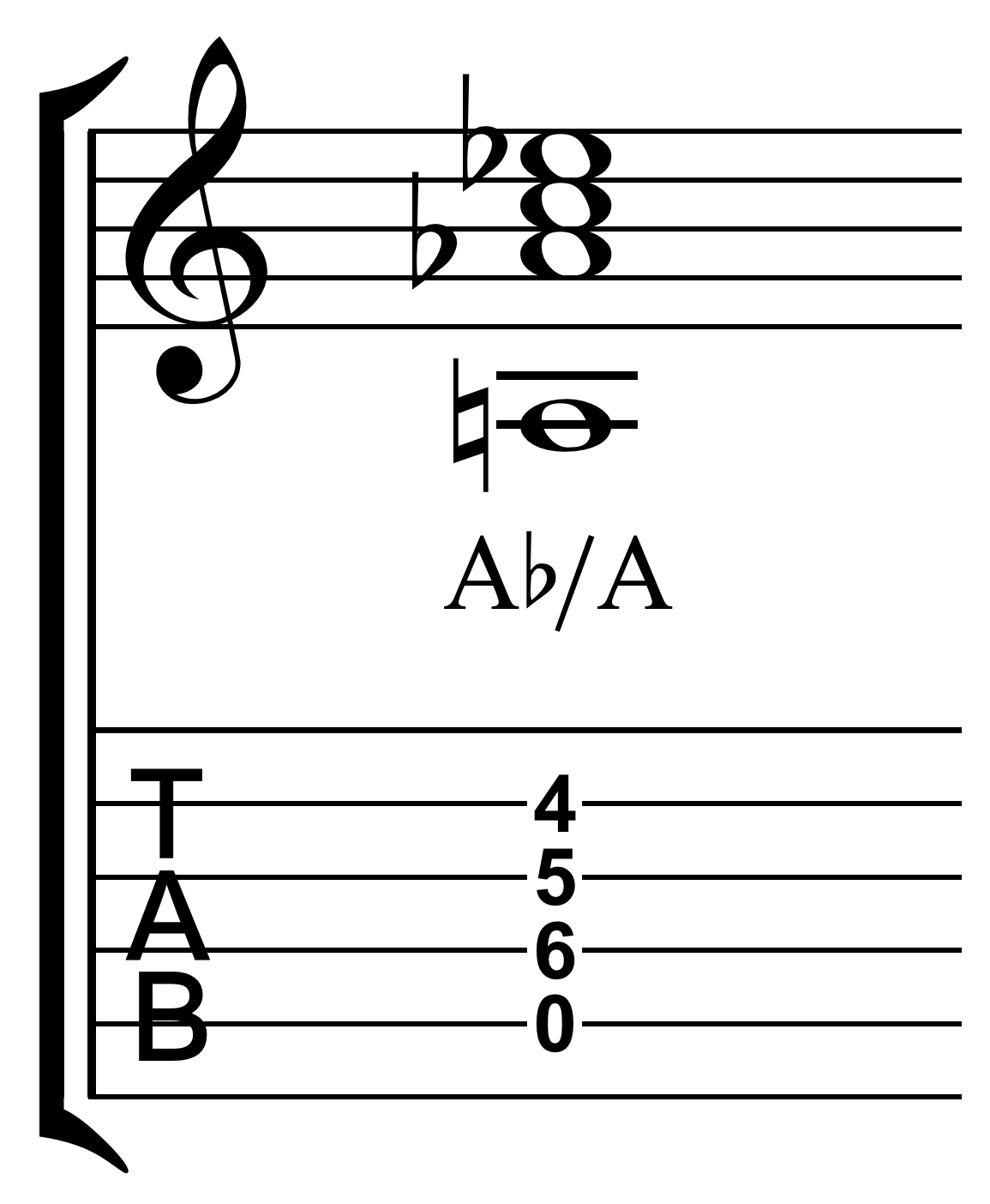
A♭/A (alternately notated as A♭ major/A bass) notated in regular notation (on top) and tabulature (below).

In popular music, where the exact arrangement of notes is less important than some other forms, slash chords are generally used only when the specific bass note is important. A common example in guitar based music is in the I-V-vi progression, in which the V chord is a passing chord. By placing the third of the V chord in the bass, a descending scale, also known as a walkdown, is created in the bass. For example, in the key of G major this would be the chords G, D/F♯, Em. That progression has the descending bassline G, F♯, E. This type of slash chord contains diatonically occurring notes. In traditional Classical notation it would be written using figured bass symbols. Another commonly used type of slash chord in chord progressions is the minor key progression i – i/VII bass – iv/VI bass – V. In the key of A minor, this chord progression would be notated A minor, A minor/G, D Minor/F, E major (or E7). This descending bassline moving diatonically from i to V is a stock feature in popular music that is used in numerous songs.

== In easy arrangements ==
Some arrangers use slash chords to avoid writing chords more complex than triads, to make arrangements easier to play for beginners. Thus, in a song in the key of C major, when the arranger wishes the chord-playing musicians to perform a ii7 chord, rather than write Dm7 (which some beginners might not be familiar with), the arranger could write F/D. This enables a beginning chord-playing musician to perform a Dm7 chord even if they are not familiar with the fingering for seventh chords. The use of slash chords can enable beginning musicians to perform quite complex chords. For example, even though a beginner may not know what a dominant seventh flat ninth chord is, they will be able to play this chord if it is notated in slash notation, as long as they are familiar with the diminished seventh chord. In the key of C, a G7♭9 chord could be notated in slash notation as B°7/G (or B°7/G bass).

== In jazz ==
Some sources notate slash chords with a horizontal line, although this is discouraged as this type of notation can also imply a polychord. While almost all pop and rock usages of slash chords are intended to be read as a chord with a bass note underneath it other than the root of the chord, in jazz and jazz fusion, sometimes a chord notated as F/A is intended to be read as a polychord; in this example, the polychord would be an F major chord (the notes F, A, and C) and an A major chord (the notes A, C♯, and E) played simultaneously. To avoid ambiguity in a jazz or fusion chart, some arrangers use the notation "bass" to indicate when the second note (after the slash) is a bass note. Thus, F/A bass indicates an F major chord with an A bass note, whereas F/A may indicate a polychord with an F major chord and an A major chord.

== See also ==
- Chord chart
- V9sus4 chord
- Chordioid
