= Polychord =

Type of musical chord

Fred Steiner's 1957 Perry Mason theme, "Park Avenue Beat", ends with a D/Cm polychord quoted by Frank Zappa in "Jezebel Boy", Broadway the Hard Way (1988) and described by Walter Everett as "juicy".

In music and music theory, a polychord consists of two or more chords, one on top of the other. In chord notation, polychords are written with the top chord above a line and the bottom chord below, for example, F over C (shown below) is notated as F/C.

The use of polychords may suggest bitonality or polytonality. Harmonic parallelism may suggest bichords. Examples may be found in Igor Stravinsky's Petrushka, p. 15 (for instance, the Petrushka chord) and Rite of Spring, "Dance of the Adolescents".

In the polychords below, the first might suggest a thirteenth chord, the second may suggest a D minor ninth chord with upper extensions, but the octave separation of the third makes the suggestion of two independent triads a minor ninth apart even more likely, and the fourth is a split-third chord.

Extended chords contain more than one triad, and so can be regarded as a type of polychord. For example, G^{7♯11♭9} (G–B–D–F–A♭–C♯) is formed from a G major triad (G–B–D) and a D♭ major triad (D♭–F–A♭), or D♭/G. (C♯ ≡ D♭).

The Lydian augmented scale, "has a polychord sound built in," created by superimposing the Caug and the E and/or F♯dim triads that exist in the scale, this being, "a very common practice for most bop and post-bop players [such as McCoy Tyner]."

== See also ==
- Chordioid
- Secundal
- Tertian
- Quartal and quintal harmony
- Upper structure
