= William Weaver Austin =

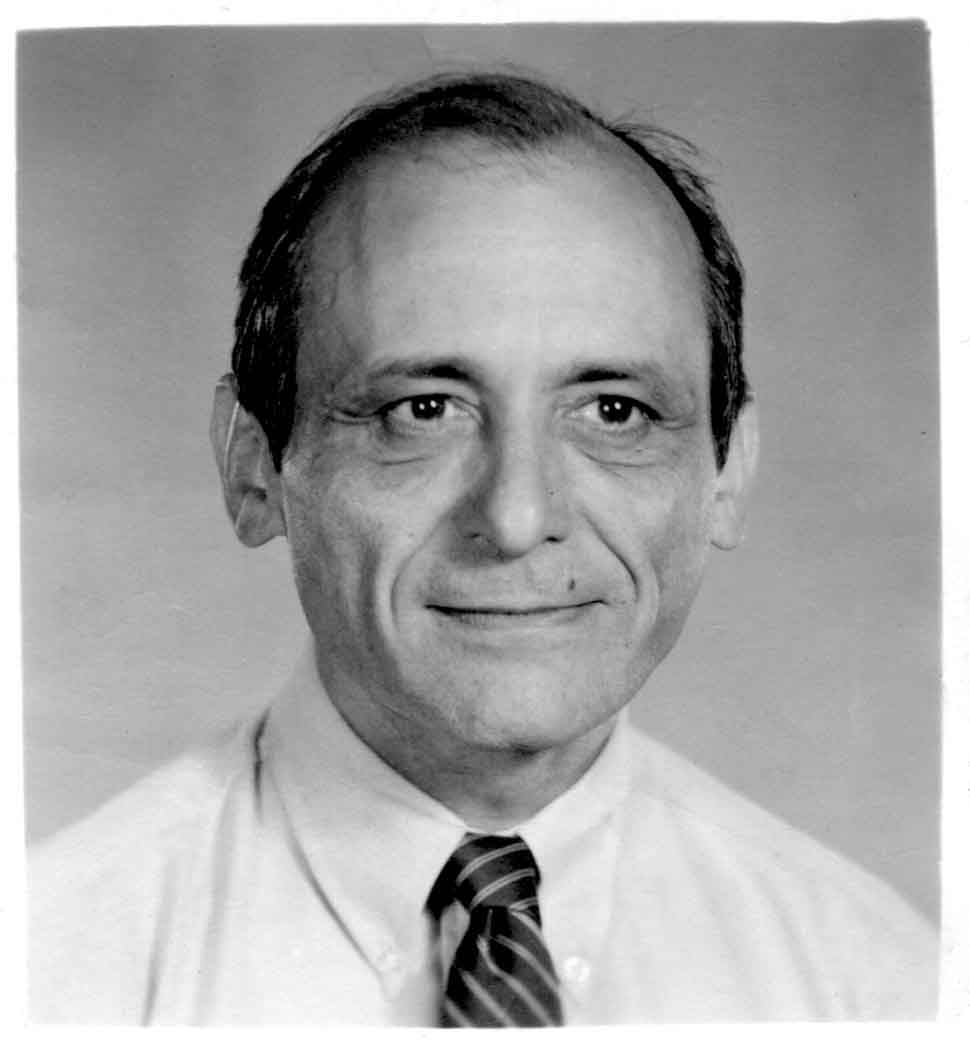
William Weaver Austin

William Weaver Austin (January 18, 1920 – March 15, 2000) was an American musicologist, organist, and pianist.

Austin was born in Lawton, Oklahoma on January 18, 1920, and attended schools in Kansas City, Missouri, Great Falls, Montana, and Minneapolis, Minnesota. Aged 15, he accepted admission to Harvard University, where he studied American history and literature. He came to know Walter Piston, and participated in the Harvard Glee Club as an accompanist. Following the completion of his master's degree at Harvard in 1940, Austin went to the Berkshire Music Center to coach opera and study counterpoint under Paul Hindemith. In 1941, Austin spent some time at the MacDowell Colony. Between 1942 and 1946, Austin served in the United States Navy. He taught at the University of Virginia for three semesters, from 1945 to 1947. He was named an assistant professor at Cornell University in 1947. Austin became an associate professor in 1950, and received his doctorate from Harvard in 1951, for the dissertation "Harmonic Rhythm in Twentieth-Century Music." Between 1952 and 1953, Austin was the recipient of a fellowship from the American Council of Learned Societies. Austin was chair of the music department from 1958 to 1963. He was promoted to a full professorship in 1959 and awarded a Guggenheim Fellowship in 1961.

His book, Music in the 20th Century from Debussy through Stravinsky, published in 1966, was the first recipient of the Otto Kinkeldey Award from the American Musicological Society. It is still in print with the original publisher: W.W. Norton. He was awarded the Dent Medal by the Royal Musical Association in 1967. His book Susanna, Jeanie and The Old Folks at Home: The Songs of Stephen Foster from his time to ours, originally published by MacMillan in 1975, was reissued by the University of Illinois Press in 1987.

Austin was elected the Goldwin Smith Professor of Musicology in 1969, and the Given Foundation Professor of Musicology in 1983. He retired from Cornell in 1990, and was granted emeritus status. Over the course of his career, Austin was a member of the International Musicological Society, Royal Musical Association, Music Library Association, and the Society for Music Theory, as well as the American Musicological Society, of which he was elected an honorary member in 1996. Austin died in Ithaca, New York, on March 15, 2000, aged 80.
