= Inversion (music) =

Top-to-bottom rearrangement of a musical interval, chord, or melody

An example of melodic inversion from the fugue in D minor from J. S. Bach's The Well-Tempered Clavier, Book 1. Though they start on different pitches (A and E), the second highlighted melody is the upside-down version of the first highlighted melody. That is, when the first goes up, the second goes down the same number of diatonic steps (with some chromatic alteration); and when the first goes down, the second goes up the same number of steps.

In music theory, an inversion is a rearrangement of the top-to-bottom elements in an interval, a chord, a melody, or a group of contrapuntal lines of music. In each of these cases, "inversion" has a distinct but related meaning. The concept of inversion also plays an important role in musical set theory.

== Intervals ==
An interval is inverted by raising or lowering either of the notes by one or more octaves so that the higher note becomes the lower note and vice versa. For example, the inversion of an interval consisting of a C with an E above it (the third measure below) is an E with a C above it – to work this out, the C may be moved up, the E may be lowered, or both may be moved.

Interval number under inversion
| Unison | ↔ | Octave |
| Second | ↔ | Seventh |
| Third | ↔ | Sixth |
| Fourth | ↔ | Fifth |

Interval quality under inversion
| Perfect | ↔ | Perfect |
| Major | ↔ | Minor |
| Augmented | ↔ | Diminished |
| Accute | ↔ | Grave |

The tables to the right show the changes in interval quality and interval number under inversion. Thus, perfect intervals remain perfect, major intervals become minor and vice versa, and augmented intervals become diminished and vice versa. (Doubly diminished intervals become doubly augmented intervals, and vice versa.).

Traditional interval numbers add up to nine: seconds become sevenths and vice versa, thirds become sixths and vice versa, and so on. Thus, a perfect fourth becomes a perfect fifth, an augmented fourth becomes a diminished fifth, and a simple interval (that is, one that is narrower than an octave) and its inversion, when added together, equal an octave. See also complement (music).

== Chords ==
The closing phrase of the hymn-setting Rustington by the English composer Hubert Parry (1897), showing all three positions of the C major chord. (Note: The root-position triad at the end has no fifth above the root. This is common at cadences as a consequence of the voice leading.) See figured bass below for a description of the numerical symbols.

A chord's inversion describes the relationship of its lowest notes to the other notes in the chord. For instance, a C major triad contains the tones C, E and G; its inversion is determined by which of these tones is the lowest note (or bass note) in the chord.

The term inversion often categorically refers to the different possibilities, though it may also be restricted to only those chords where the lowest note is not also the root of the chord. Texts that follow this restriction may use the term position instead, to refer to all of the possibilities as a category.

=== Root position and inverted chords ===
A chord is in root position if its root is the lowest note. This is sometimes known as the parent chord of its inversions. For example, the root of a C-major triad is C, so a C-major triad will be in root position if C is the lowest note and its third and fifth (E and G, respectively) are above it – or, on occasion, do not sound at all.

The following C-major triads are both in root position, since the lowest note is the root. The rearrangement of the notes above the bass into different octaves (here, the note E) and the doubling of notes (here, G), is known as voicing – the first voicing is close voicing, while the second is open.

In an inverted chord, the root is not the lowest note. The inversions are numbered in the order their lowest notes appear in a close root-position chord (from bottom to top).

As shown above, a C-major triad (or any chord with three notes) has two inversions:

1. In the first inversion, the lowest note is E – the third of the triad – with the fifth and the root stacked above it (the root now shifted an octave higher), forming the intervals of a minor third and a minor sixth above the inverted bass of E, respectively.
2. In the second inversion, the lowest note is G – the fifth of the triad – with the root and the third above it (both again shifted an octave higher), forming a fourth and a sixth above the (inverted) bass of G, respectively.

Chords with four notes (such as seventh chords) work in a similar way, except that they have three inversions, instead of just two. The three inversions of a G dominant seventh chord are:

==== Notating root position and inversions ====
===== Figured bass =====
Common Conventional Symbols for Figured Bass
Triads
| Inversion | Intervals above bass | Symbol | Example |
|---|---|---|---|
| Root position | ^{5}_{3} | None | |
| 1st inversion | ^{6}_{3} | ^{6} | |
| 2nd inversion | ^{6}_{4} | ^{6}_{4} | |
Seventh chords
| Inversion | Intervals above bass | Symbol | Example |
| Root position | | ^{7} | |
| 1st inversion | | ^{6}_{5} | |
| 2nd inversion | | ^{4}_{3} | |
| 3rd inversion | | ^{4}_{2} or ^{2} | |

Figured bass is a notation in which chord inversions are indicated by Arabic numerals (the figures) either above or below the bass notes, indicating a harmonic progression. Each numeral expresses the interval that results from the voices above it (usually assuming octave equivalence). For example, in root-position triad C–E–G, the intervals above bass note C are a third and a fifth, giving the figures ^{5}_{3}. If this triad were in first inversion (e.g., E–G–C), the figure ^{6}_{3} would apply, due to the intervals of a third and a sixth appearing above the bass note E.

Certain conventional abbreviations exist in the use of figured bass. For instance, root-position triads appear without symbols (the ^{5}_{3} is understood), and first-inversion triads are customarily abbreviated as just ^{6}, rather than ^{6}_{3}. The table to the right displays these conventions.

Figured-bass numerals express distinct intervals in a chord only as they relate to the bass note. They make no reference to the key of the progression (unlike Roman-numeral harmonic analysis), they do not express intervals between pairs of upper voices themselves – for example, in a C–E–G triad, the figured bass does not signify the interval relationship between E–G, and they do not express notes in upper voices that double, or are unison with, the bass note.

However, the figures are often used on their own (without the bass) in music theory simply to specify a chord's inversion. This is the basis for the terms given above such as "^{6}_{4} chord" for a second inversion triad. Similarly, in harmonic analysis the term I^{6} refers to a tonic triad in first inversion.

===== Popular-music notation =====
A notation for chord inversion often used in popular music is to write the name of a chord followed by a forward slash and then the name of the bass note. This is called a slash chord. For example, a C-major chord in first inversion (i.e., with E in the bass) would be notated as "C/E". This notation works even when a note not present in a triad is the bass; for example, F/G is a way of notating a particular approach to voicing an Fadd^{9} chord (G–F–A–C). This is quite different from analytical notations of function; e.g., the notation "IV/V" represents the subdominant of the dominant.

===== Lower-case letters =====
Lower-case letters may be placed after a chord symbol to indicate root position or inversion. Hence, in the key of C major, a C-major chord in first inversion may be notated as Ib, indicating chord I, first inversion. (Less commonly, the root of the chord is named, followed by a lower-case letter: Cb). If no letter is added, the chord is assumed to be in root position, as though a had been inserted.

=== History ===
In Jean-Philippe Rameau's Treatise on Harmony (1722), chords in different inversions are considered functionally equivalent and he has been credited as being the first person to recognise their underlying similarity. Earlier theorists spoke of different intervals using alternative descriptions, such as the regola delle terze e seste ("rule of sixths and thirds"). This required the resolution of imperfect consonances to perfect ones and would not propose, for example, a resemblance between ^{6}_{4} and ^{5}_{3} chords.

== Counterpoint ==
An example of contrapuntal inversion in one measure of J.S. Bach's Invention No. 13 in A minor, BWV 784.

In contrapuntal inversion, two melodies, having previously accompanied each other once, accompany each other again but with the melody that had been in the high voice now in the low, and vice versa. The action of changing the voices is called textural inversion. This is called double counterpoint when two voices are involved and triple counterpoint when three are involved. The inversion in two-part invertible counterpoint is also known as rivolgimento.

=== Invertible counterpoint ===
Themes that can be developed in this way without violating the rules of counterpoint are said to be in invertible counterpoint. Invertible counterpoint can occur at various intervals, usually the octave, less often at the tenth or twelfth. That interval, called the interval of inversion, can be obtained by adding the intervals by which each voice has moved and subtracting one. For example: If motif A in the high voice moves down a sixth, and motif B in the low voice moves up a fifth, in such a way as to result in A and B having exchanged registers, then the two are in double counterpoint at the tenth (6 + 5 – 1 = 10).

In J.S. Bach's The Art of Fugue, the first canon is at the octave, the second canon at the tenth, the third canon at the twelfth, and the fourth canon in augmentation and contrary motion. Other exemplars can be found in the fugues in G minor and B♭ major from J.S. Bach's The Well-Tempered Clavier, Book 2, both of which contain invertible counterpoint at the octave, tenth, and twelfth.

=== Examples ===
For example, in the keyboard prelude in A♭ major from J.S. Bach's The Well-Tempered Clavier, Book 1, the following passage, from bars 9–18, involves two lines, one in each hand:

Bach's prelude in A♭ from WTC1 bars 9–18

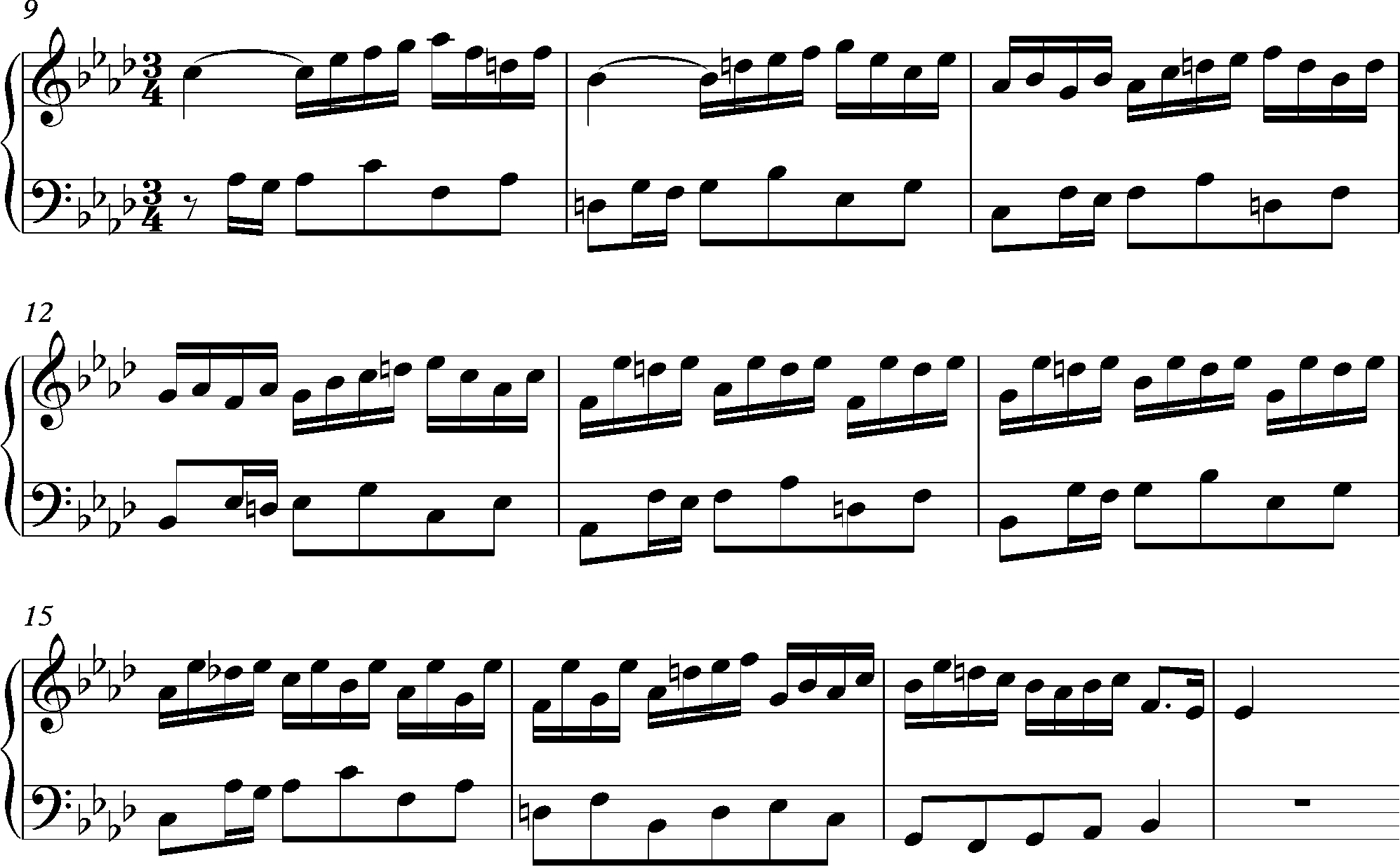
Bach's Prelude in A♭ from WTC1 bars 9–18

When this passage returns in bars 25–35 these lines are exchanged:

Bach's Prelude in A♭ from WTC1 bars 25–36

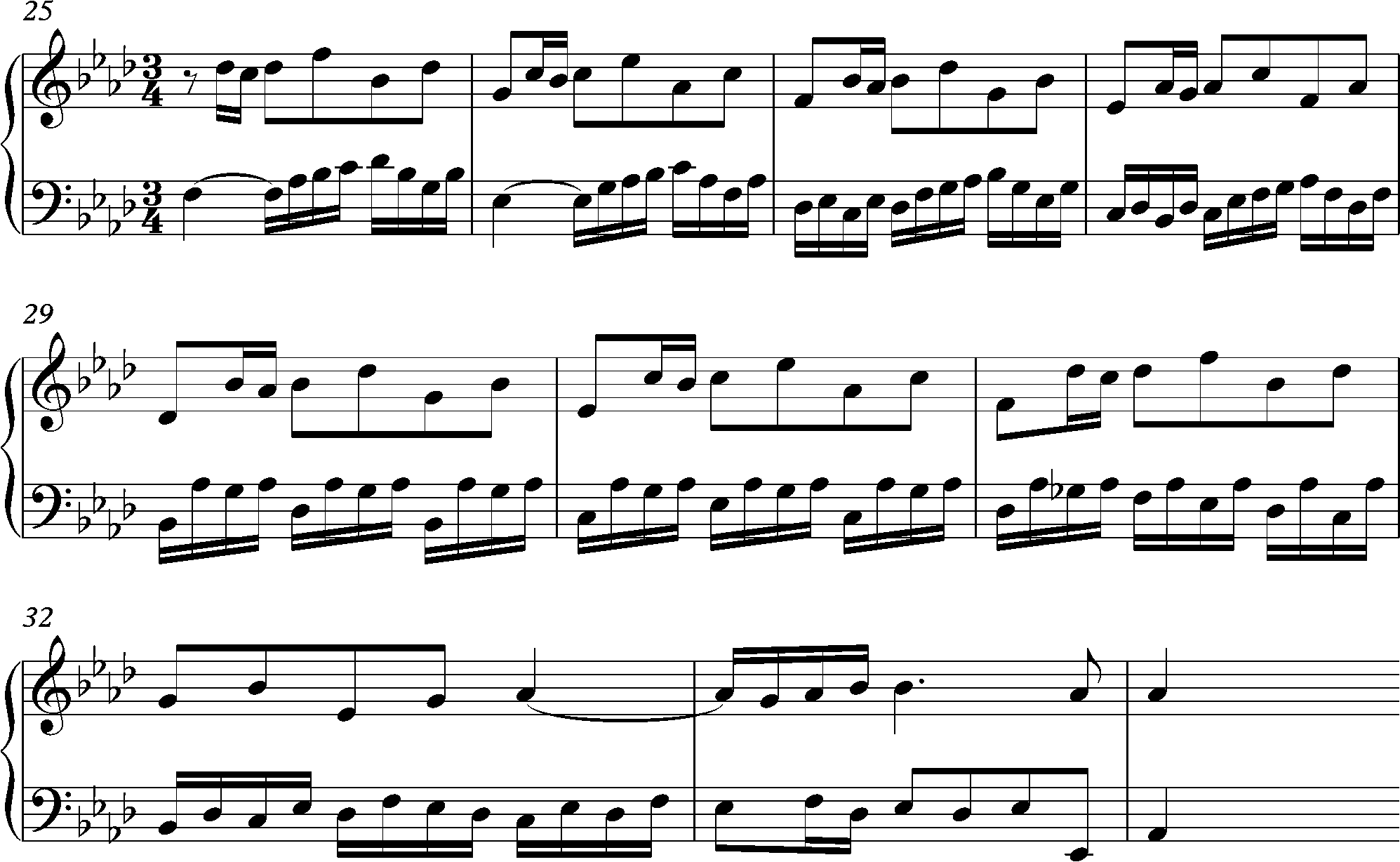
Bach's Prelude in A♭ from WTC1 bars 25–35

J.S. Bach's Three-Part Invention in F minor, BWV 795 involves exploring the combination of three themes. Two of these are announced in the opening two bars. A third idea joins them in bars 3–4. When this passage is repeated a few bars later in bars 7–9, the three parts are interchanged:

Bach's three-part Invention (Sinfonia) in F minor BWV 795, bars 1–9

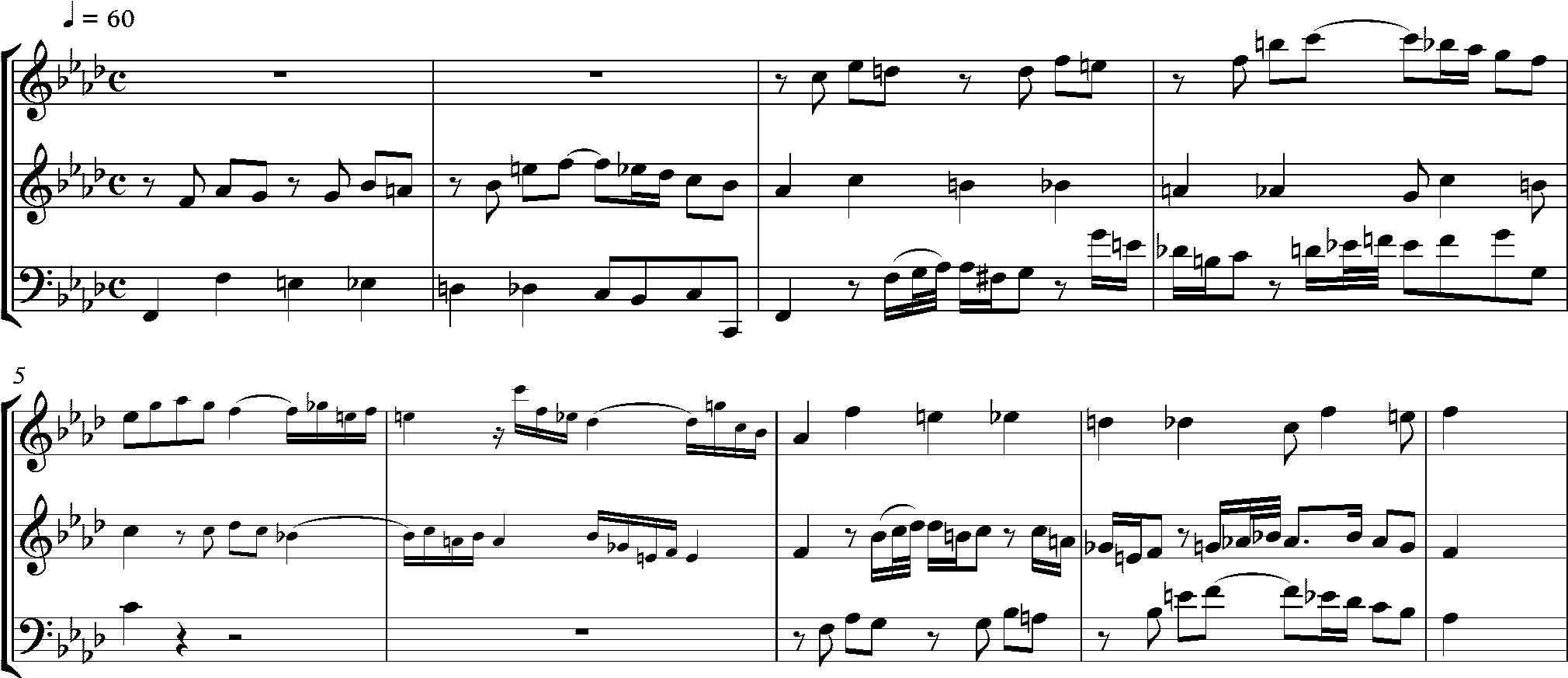
Bach's three-part Invention (Sinfonia) BWV 795, bars 1–9

The piece goes on to explore four of the six possible permutations of how these three lines can be combined in counterpoint.

One of the most spectacular examples of invertible counterpoint occurs in the finale of Mozart's Jupiter Symphony. Here, no less than five themes are heard together:

Mozart Symphony No. 41 Finale, bars 389–396

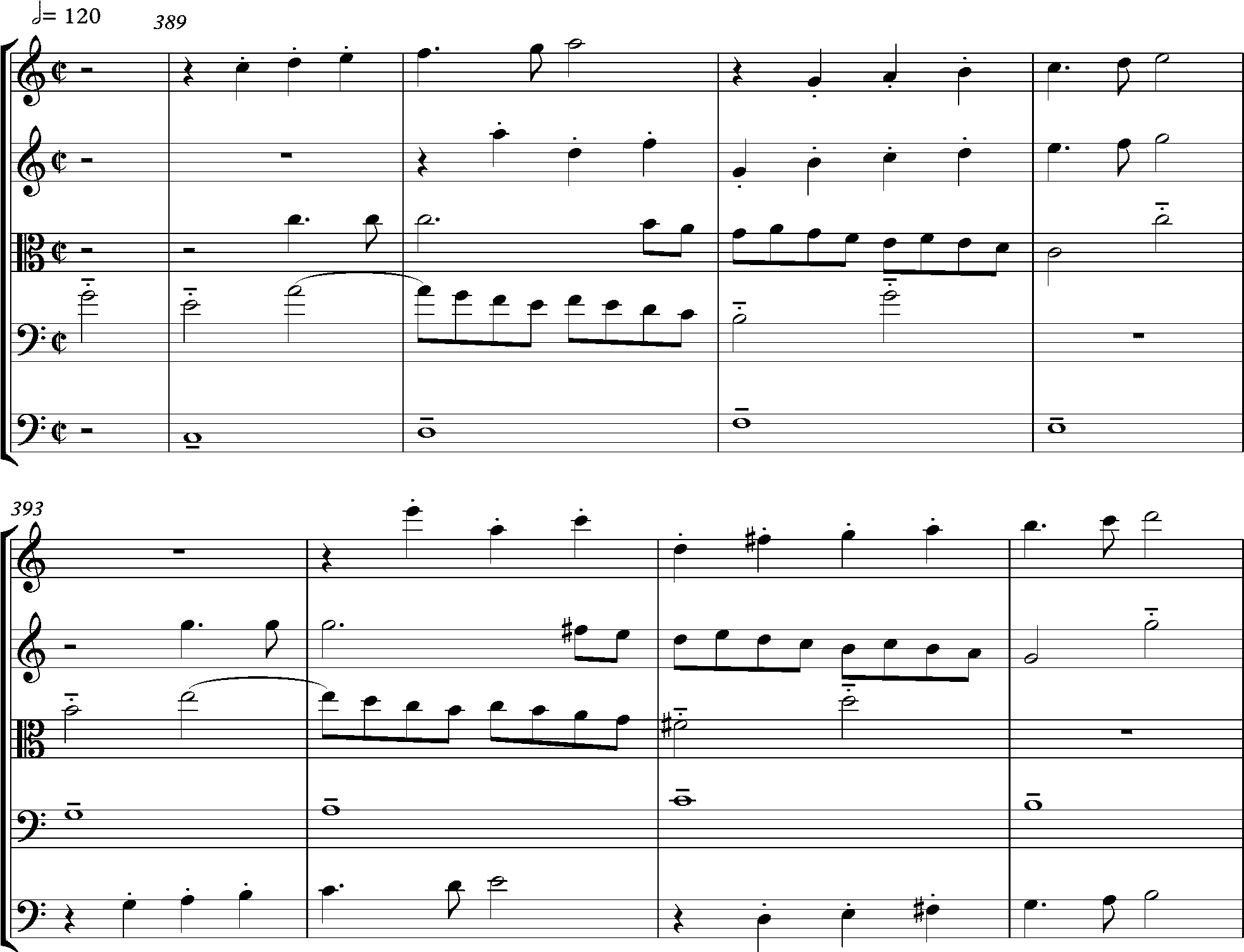
Mozart Symphony No. 41 Finale, bars 389–396

The whole passage brings the symphony to a conclusion in a blaze of brilliant orchestral writing. According to Tom Service:

Mozart's composition of the finale of the Jupiter Symphony is a palimpsest on music history as well as his own. As a musical achievement, its most obvious predecessor is really the fugal finale of his G major String Quartet K. 387, but this symphonic finale trumps even that piece in its scale and ambition. If the story of that operatic tune first movement is to turn instinctive emotion into contrapuntal experience, the finale does exactly the reverse, transmuting the most complex arts of compositional craft into pure, exhilarating feeling. Its models in Michael and Joseph Haydn are unquestionable, but Mozart simultaneously pays homage to them – and transcends them. Now that's what I call real originality.

== Melodies ==
Two lines from the fugue in G major from J. S. Bach's The Well-Tempered Clavier, Book 1. The lowest voice in mm. 28–30 is an inversion of the opening melody in mm. 1–3.

A melody is inverted by flipping it "upside-down", reversing the melody's contour. For instance, if the original melody has a rising major third, then the inverted melody has a falling major third (or, especially in tonal music, perhaps a falling minor third).

According to The Harvard Dictionary of Music, "The intervals between successive pitches may remain exact or, more often in tonal music, they may be the equivalents in the diatonic scale. Hence c'–d–e' may become c'–b–a (where the first descent is by a semitone rather than by a whole tone) instead of c'–b♭–a♭." Moreover, the inversion may start on the same pitch as the original melody, but it does not have to, as illustrated by the example to the right.

=== Twelve-tone music ===
In twelve-tone technique, the inversion of a tone row is one of its four traditional permutations (the others being the prime form, the retrograde, and the retrograde inversion). These four permutations (labeled prime, retrograde, inversion, and retrograde inversion) for the tone row used in Arnold Schoenberg's Variations for Orchestra, Op. 31 are shown below.

In set theory, the inverse operation is sometimes designated as $T_nI$, where $I$ means "invert" and $T_n$ means "transpose by some interval $n$" measured in number of semitones. Thus, inversion is a combination of an inversion followed by a transposition. To apply the inversion operation $I$, you subtract the pitch class, in integer notation, from 12 (by convention, inversion is around pitch class 0). Then we apply the transposition operation $T_n$ by adding $n$. For example, to calculate $T_5I(3)$, first subtract 3 from 12 (giving 9) and then add 5 (giving 14, which is equivalent to 2). Thus, $T_5I(3)=2$. To invert a set of pitches, simply invert each pitch in the set in turn.

== Inversional equivalency and symmetry ==
=== Set theory ===
In set theory, inversional equivalency is the concept that intervals, chords, and other sets of pitches are the same when inverted. It is similar to enharmonic equivalency, octave equivalency and even transpositional equivalency. Inversional equivalency is used little in tonal theory, though it is assumed that sets that can be inverted into each other are remotely in common. However, they are only assumed identical or nearly identical in musical set theory.

Sets are said to be inversionally symmetrical if they map onto themselves under inversion. The pitch that the sets must be inverted around is said to be the axis of symmetry (or center). An axis may either be at a specific pitch or halfway between two pitches (assuming that microtones are not used). For example, the set C–E♭–E–F♯–G–B♭ has an axis at F, and an axis, a tritone away, at B if the set is listed as F♯–G–B♭–C–E♭–E. As another example, the set C–E–F–F♯–G–B has an axis at the dyad F/F♯ and an axis at B/C if it is listed as F♯–G–B–C–E–F.

=== Jazz theory ===
Pitch axis inversions of "Twinkle, Twinkle, Little Star" about C and A

In jazz theory, a pitch axis is the center around which a melody is inverted.

The "pitch axis" works in the context of the compound operation transpositional inversion, where transposition is carried out after inversion. However, unlike in set theory, the transposition may be a chromatic or diatonic transposition. Thus, if D–A–G (P5 up, M2 down) is inverted to D–G–A (P5 down, M2 up) the "pitch axis" is D. However, if it is inverted to C–F–G the pitch axis is G while if the pitch axis is A, the melody inverts to E–A–B.

The notation of octave position may determine how many lines and spaces appear to share the axis. The pitch axis of D–A–G and its inversion A–D–E either appear to be between C/B♮ or the single pitch F.

== See also ==
- Voicing (music)
- Pitch axis theory
- Retrograde inversion
