= 1897 =

1897 in various calendars
- Gregorian calendar: 1897; MDCCCXCVII
- Ab urbe condita: 2650
- Armenian calendar: 1346; ԹՎ ՌՅԽԶ
- Assyrian calendar: 6647
- Baháʼí calendar: 53–54
- Balinese saka calendar: 1818–1819
- Bengali calendar: 1303–1304
- Berber calendar: 2847
- British Regnal year: 60 Vict. 1 – 61 Vict. 1
- Buddhist calendar: 2441
- Burmese calendar: 1259
- Byzantine calendar: 7405–7406
- Chinese calendar: 丙申年 (Fire Monkey); 4594 or 4387 — to — 丁酉年 (Fire Rooster); 4595 or 4388
- Coptic calendar: 1613–1614
- Discordian calendar: 3063
- Ethiopian calendar: 1889–1890
- Hebrew calendar: 5657–5658
- Hindu calendars
- Vikram Samvat: 1953–1954
- Shaka Samvat: 1818–1819
- Kali Yuga: 4997–4998
- Holocene calendar: 11897
- Igbo calendar: 897–898
- Iranian calendar: 1275–1276
- Islamic calendar: 1314–1315
- Japanese calendar: Meiji 30 (明治３０年)
- Javanese calendar: 1826–1827
- Julian calendar: Gregorian minus 12 days
- Korean calendar: 4230
- Minguo calendar: 15 before ROC 民前15年
- Nanakshahi calendar: 429
- Thai solar calendar: 2439–2440
- Tibetan calendar: མེ་ཕོ་སྤྲེ་ལོ་ (male Fire-Monkey); 2023 or 1642 or 870 — to — མེ་མོ་བྱ་ལོ་ (female Fire-Bird); 2024 or 1643 or 871

1897 (MDCCCXCVII) was a common year starting on Friday of the Gregorian calendar and a common year starting on Wednesday of the Julian calendar, the 1897th year of the Common Era (CE) and Anno Domini (AD) designations, the 897th year of the 2nd millennium, the 97th year of the 19th century, and the 8th year of the 1890s decade. As of the start of 1897, the Gregorian calendar was 12 days ahead of the Julian calendar, which remained in localized use until 1923.

== Events ==
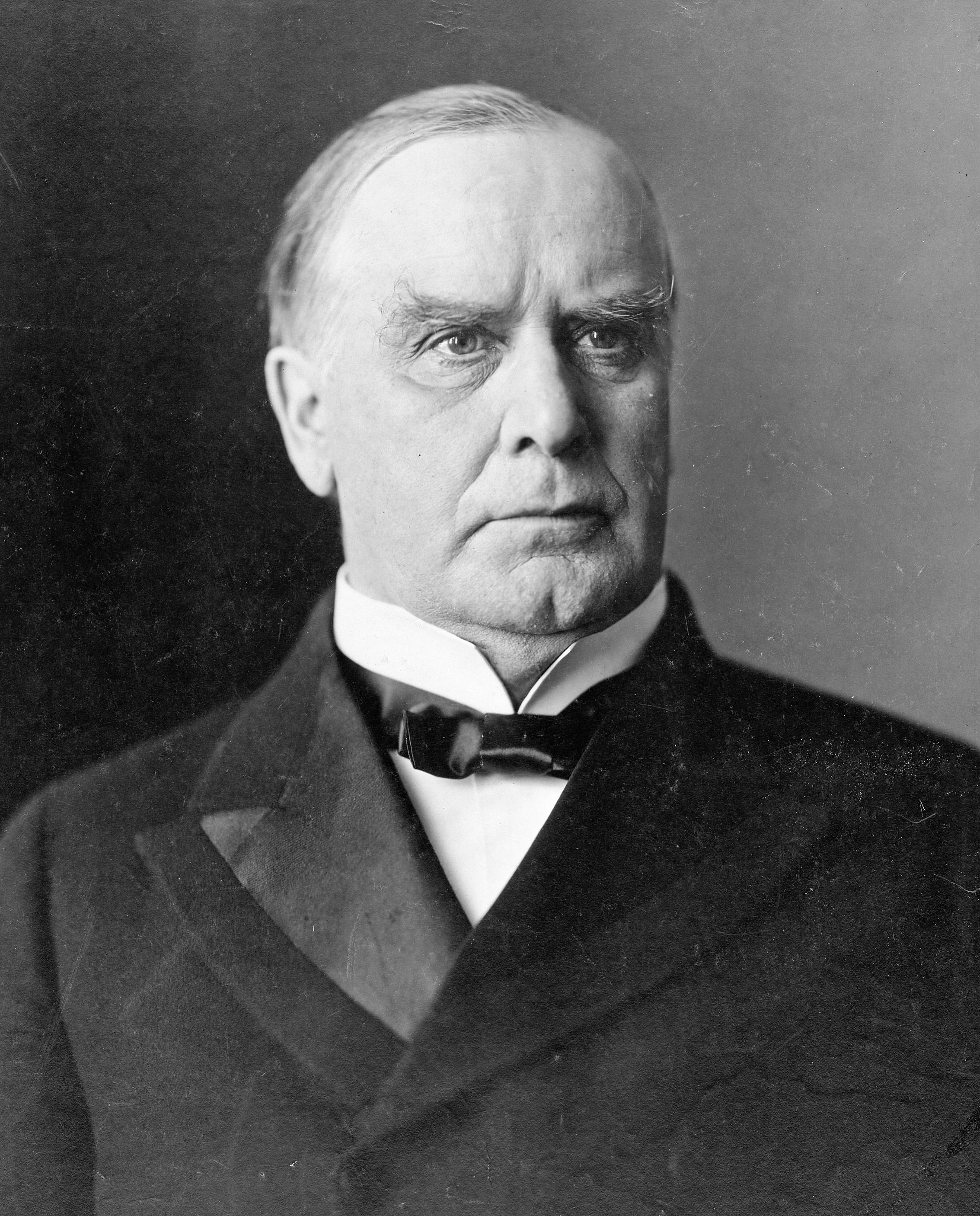
March 4: U.S. President William McKinley inaugurated

=== January ===
- January 2 – The International Alpha Omicron Pi sorority is founded, in New York City.
- January 4 – A British force is ambushed by Chief Ologbosere, son-in-law of the ruler. This leads to a punitive expedition against Benin.
- January 7 – A cyclone destroys Darwin, Australia.
- January 8 – Lady Flora Shaw, future wife of Governor General Lord Lugard, officially proposes the name "Nigeria" in a newspaper contest, to be given to the British Niger Coast Protectorate.
- January 22 – In this date's issue of the journal Engineering, the word computer is first used to refer to a mechanical calculation device.
- January 31 – The Czechoslovak Trade Union Association is founded in Prague.

=== February ===
- February 10 – Freedom of religion is proclaimed in Madagascar.
- February 16 – The French conquer the island of Raiatea and capture the rebel chief Teraupo'o, ending the Leeward Islands War and bringing all of the Society Islands under their control.
- February 18 – Benin is put to the torch by the British Army's Benin Expedition. Ovonramwen, Oba of Benin, is exiled from his kingdom and the Benin Bronzes are carried off to London.
- February 26 – The Sigma Pi fraternity is founded in Vincennes, Indiana.
- February 27 – The French military governor of Madagascar, Joseph Gallieni, exiles Queen Ranavalona III to Réunion, abolishing the monarchy the next day.

=== March ===
- March 13 – San Diego State University is founded.
- March 22 – Emilio Aguinaldo unseats Andrés Bonifacio at the Tejeros Convention, becoming the new head of the Filipino revolutionary group Katipunan.

=== April ===
- April 15
  - Drillers near Bartlesville, Oklahoma strike oil for the first time, in the designated "Indian Territory", on land leased from the Osage Indians. The gusher, at the Nellie Johnstone Number One well, leads to rapid population growth.
  - Yamaichi Securities founded in Japan; it will cease trading a hundred years later.
- April 18 – The Greco-Turkish War of 1897 breaks out.
- April 19 – The first Boston Marathon is held in the United States, with fifteen men competing, and is won by John McDermott.
- April 23 – Representatives of the Chickasaw Nation, Choctaw Nation and U.S. Dawes Commission sign the Atoka Agreement, which becomes an important precursor for creating the State of Oklahoma.
- April 27–6 May – Greco-Turkish War of 1897: Battle of Velestino.
- April 30 – J. J. Thomson of the Cavendish Laboratory announces his discovery of the electron as a subatomic particle, over 1,800 times smaller than a proton (in the atomic nucleus), at a lecture at the Royal Institution in London.

=== May ===
- May 6 – John Jacob Abel announces the successful isolation of epinephrine (adrenaline), in a paper read before the Association of American Physicians.
- May 10 – 19 zinc miners die of carbon monoxide poisoning at Snaefell Mine on the Isle of Man.
- May 11 – A patent is awarded for the invention of the first automotive muffler, with the granting by the U.S. Patent Office of application number 582,485 to Milton Reeves and his brother Marshall T. Reeves, of the Reeves Pulley Company of Columbus, Indiana.
- May 14
  - The Stars and Stripes Forever, an American patriotic march by John Philip Sousa, is performed for the first time.
  - (or May 15) – The Scientific-Humanitarian Committee (Wissenschaftlich-humanitäres Komitee, WhK) is founded in Berlin as an LGBT campaigning organization, the first such in history.
- May 19 – Oscar Wilde is released from prison in England, and goes into voluntary exile on the continent.
- May 22 – The Blackwall Tunnel, at this time the longest underwater road tunnel in the world, is opened for traffic beneath the River Thames in the East End of London by the Prince of Wales.
- May 26 – Irish-born theatrical manager Bram Stoker's contemporary Gothic horror novel Dracula is first published (in London); it will influence the direction of vampire literature for the following century.
- May 31 – On Decoration Day (later Memorial Day) the Robert Gould Shaw Memorial is dedicated in Boston. The bronze bas relief by Augustus St. Gaudens depicts the 54th Massachusetts Infantry Regiment of black Civil War soldiers.

=== June ===
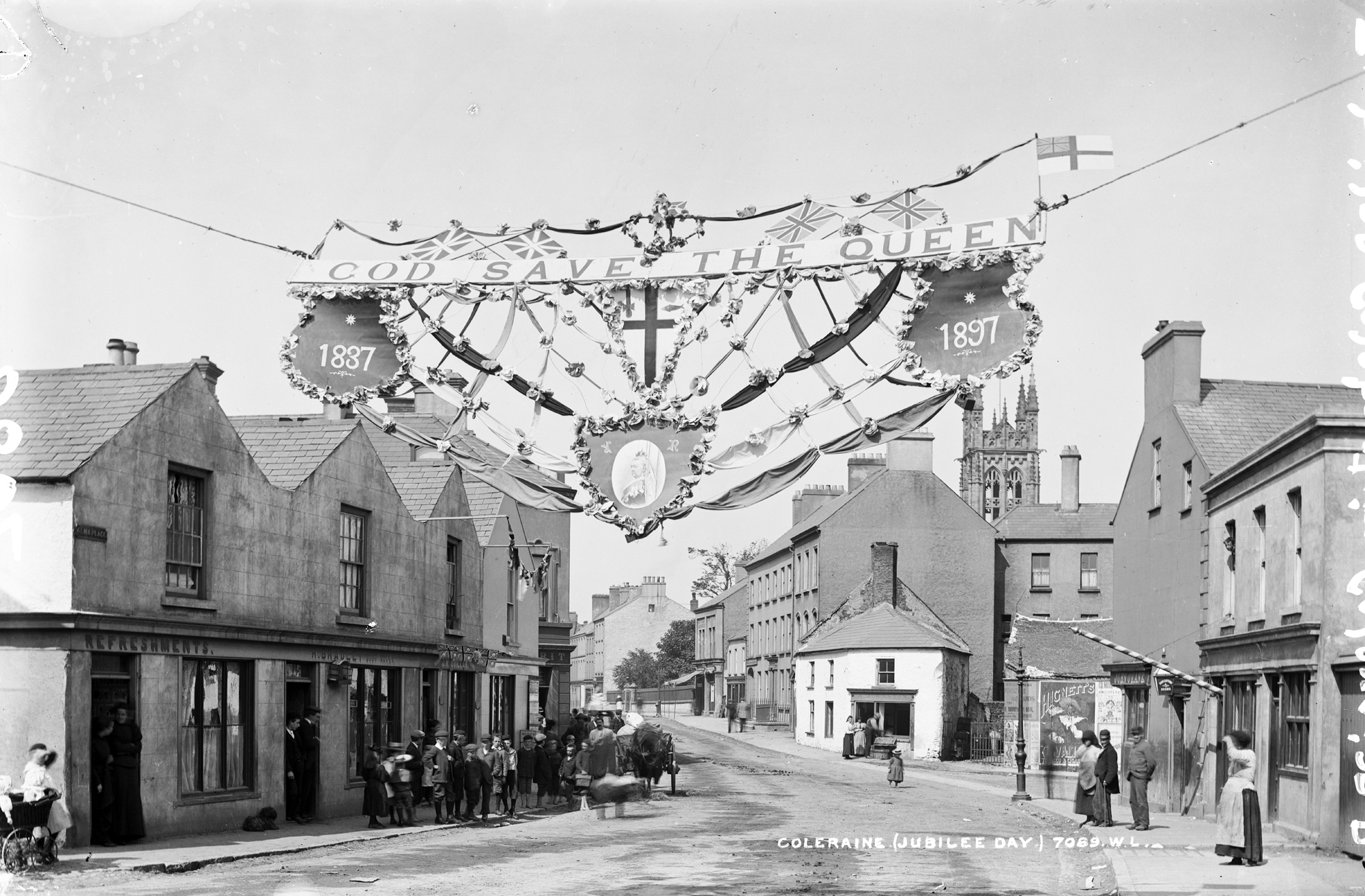
Display in celebration of Queen Victoria's Diamond Jubilee on Alma Place in Coleraine, County Londonderry, Ulster

- June 12 – 1897 Assam earthquake: An earthquake of magnitude of 8.0 rocks Assam, India, killing over 1,500 people.
- June 18 – Kyoto University is officially established in Japan.
- June 22 – The British Empire celebrates Queen Victoria's Diamond Jubilee, marking the 60th year of her reign. No other British monarch will celebrate such a jubilee until Victoria's great-great-granddaughter Elizabeth II in 2012.

=== July ===
- July 11 – S. A. Andrée's Arctic Balloon Expedition of 1897 begins. The ill-fated expedition to fly over the Arctic results in the death of the entire team within months.
- July 17 – The Klondike Gold Rush begins when the first successful prospectors arrive in Seattle
- July 25 – Writer Jack London sails to join the Klondike Gold Rush, where he will write his first successful stories.
- July 26–August 2 – Siege of Malakand: British troops are besieged by Pashtun tribesmen in Malakand, on the Northwest frontier of British India (modern-day Khyber Pakhtunkhwa in Pakistan).
- July 31 – Mount Saint Elias, the second highest peak in the United States and Canada, is first ascended.

=== August ===
- August 10 – At the Bayer pharmaceutical company, pharmacist Felix Hoffmann successfully synthesizes acetylsalicylic acid, after isolating a compound from a plant of the Spiraea family; the company markets it under the brand name "Aspirin".
- August 21 – The Olds Motor Vehicle Co. is founded in Lansing, Michigan, by Ransom E. Olds.
- August 29 – The First Zionist Congress convenes in Basel, Switzerland.
- August 31 – Thomas Edison is granted a patent for the Kinetoscope, a precursor of the movie projector.

=== September ===
- September 1 – The Tremont Street subway is opened in Boston, Massachusetts.
- September 10 – Lattimer massacre: A sheriff's posse kills 19 unarmed immigrant miners in Pennsylvania.
- September 11 – After months of searching, generals of Menelik II of Ethiopia capture Gaki Sherocho, the last king of Kaffa, bringing an end to that ancient kingdom.
- September 12 – Battle of Saragarhi: Twenty-one Sikhs of the 36th Sikhs regiment of the British Indian Army defend an army post to the death, against 10,000 Afghan and Orakzai tribesmen, in the Tirah Campaign on the Northwest frontier of the British Raj (modern-day Khyber Pakhtunkhwa in Pakistan).
- September 20 – Greece and Turkey sign a peace treaty to end the Greco-Turkish War.
- September 21 – Francis P. Church responds (anonymously) to a letter to the editor of The Sun (New York City) that is known as the famous "Yes, Virginia, there is a Santa Claus" letter.

=== October ===
October 6: Ethiopian flag

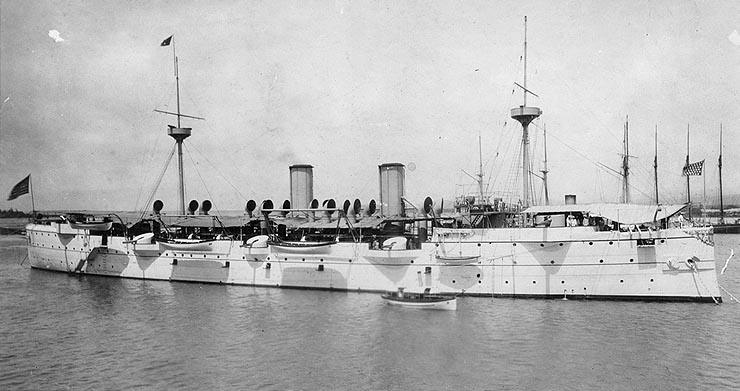
October: USS Baltimore in Hawaii

- October 5 – After a long siege, Brazilian government troops take Canudos in north Brazil, crushing Antônio Conselheiro and his followers.
- October 6 – Ethiopia adopts the tricolor flag: green is for the land, yellow for gold, and red is symbolic of strength and the blood shed.
- October 12
  - The Korean Empire is proclaimed, marking the end of the Joseon dynasty after just over 500 years.
  - The city of Belo Horizonte, Brazil is created. The construction of the second Brazilian planned city is completed successfully; an immigration of 1,000,000 people is estimated.
  - USS Baltimore (Cruiser # 3, later CM-1) is recommissioned, since 1890, for several months of duty in the Hawaiian Islands.
- October 13 – HMS Canopus, a pre-dreadnought battleship of the Royal Navy, is launched at Portsmouth, England; she will be deployed widely in World War I.
- October 23 – The Kappa Delta sorority is founded in Farmville, Virginia.

=== November ===
- November 1 – Juventus FC is founded as an association football club in Turin.
- November 25 – Spain grants Puerto Rico autonomy.

=== December ===
- December 9 – The first issue of the feminist newspaper La Fronde is published by Marguerite Durand in Paris.
- December 12
  - The comic strip The Katzenjammer Kids debuts in the New York Journal.
  - Belo Horizonte, the first planned city in Brazil, is incorporated.
- December 14 – Pact of Biak-na-Bato: The Philippine Revolution is settled, with Spanish promises to reform.
- December 28 – The play Cyrano de Bergerac, by Edmond Rostand, premieres in Paris.
- December 30 – Natal annexes Zululand.

=== Date unknown ===
- The first electric bicycle is invented.
- Karl Lueger becomes mayor of Vienna.
- Zhejiang University is founded in China.
- Émile Durkheim publishes his classic study Suicide.
- The pan-African anthem "Nkosi Sikelel' iAfrika" ("God Bless Africa") is composed as a Xhosa hymn by South African teacher Enoch Sontonga.
- Dos Equis beer is first brewed in Mexico, in anticipation of the new century. "Dos equis" is Spanish for "two x", a reference to the 20th Century (XX in Roman numerals)
- Alexander Scriabin publishes his Piano Sonata no. 2 "Sonata-Fantasia" in G sharp minor

== Births ==
=== January–February ===
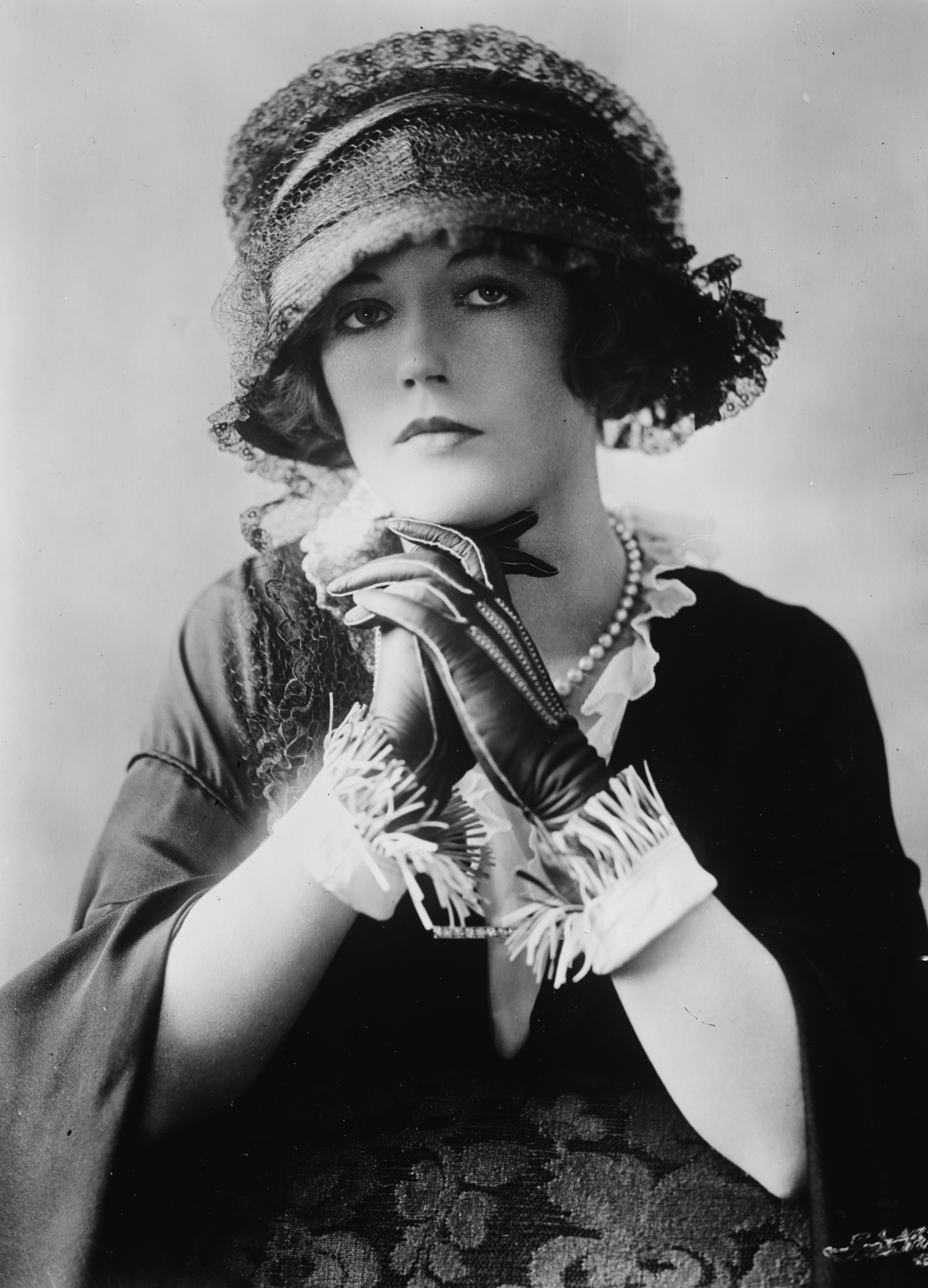
Marion Davies

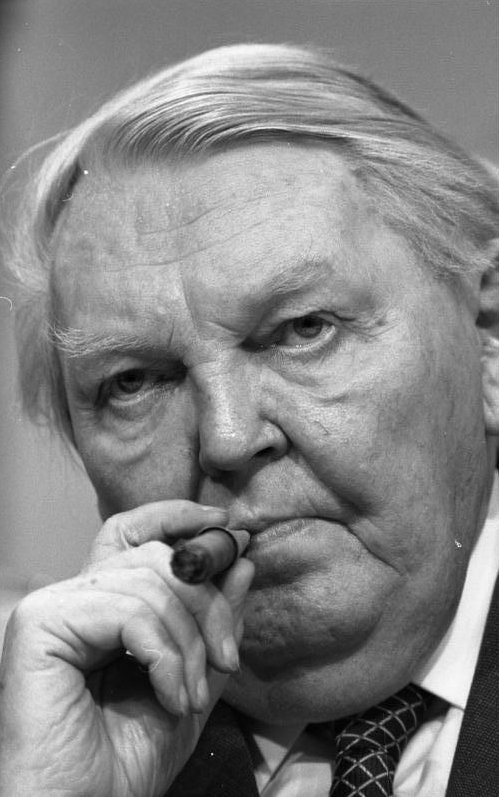
Ludwig Erhard

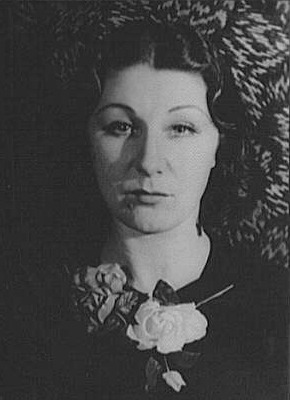
Judith Anderson

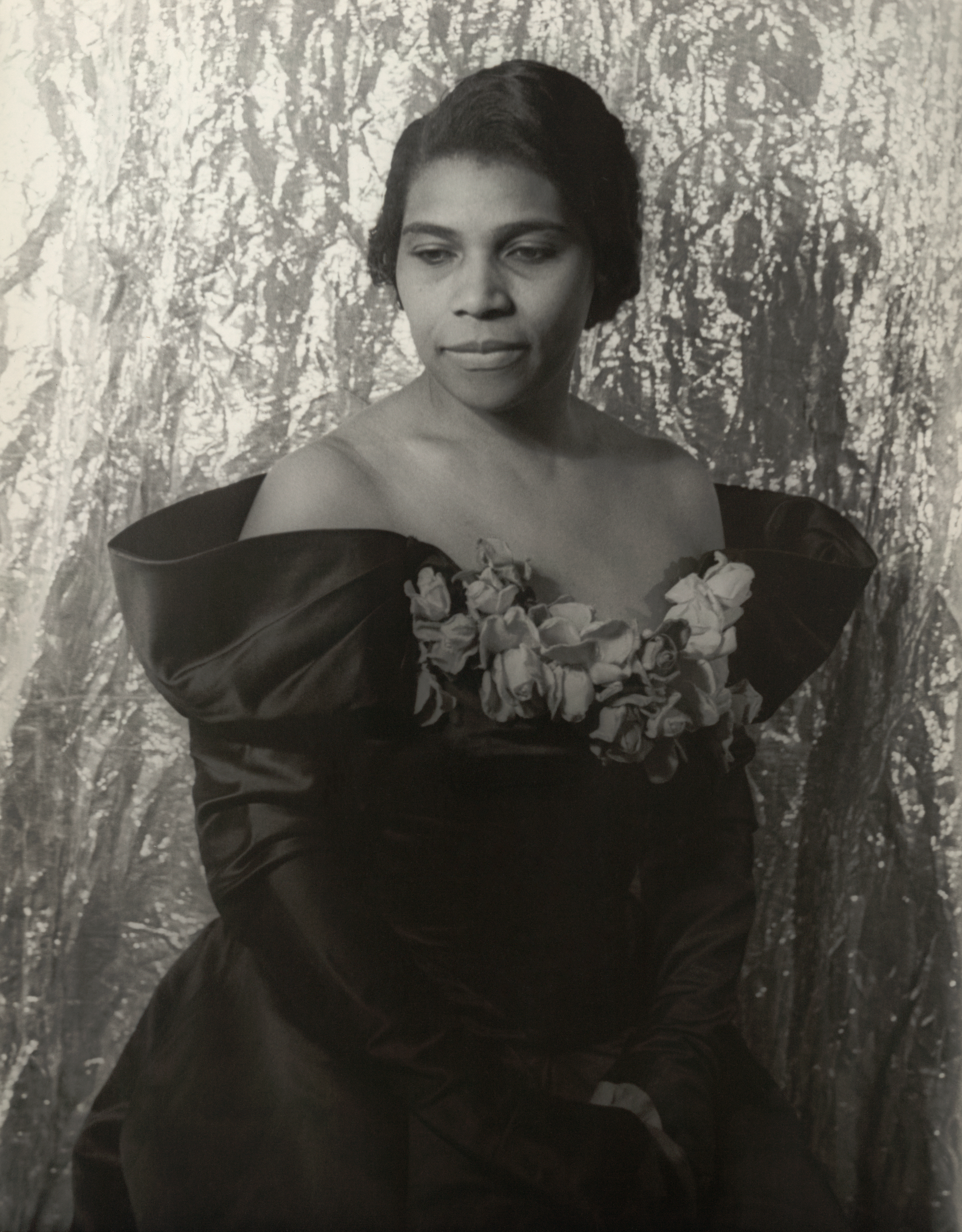
Marian Anderson

- January 3
  - Marion Davies, American actress (d. 1961)
  - Pola Negri, Polish-born American actress (d. 1987)
- January 6 – Ferenc Szálasi, 37th prime minister of Hungary (d. 1946)
- January 8 – Dennis Wheatley, English writer (d. 1977)
- January 11 – Georges Stuttler, French footballer (d. 1976)
- January 14 – Hasso von Manteuffel, German general, politician (d. 1978)
- January 23
  - Subhas Chandra Bose, Indian political leader, led the Indian National Army (d. 1945?)
  - Margarete Schütte-Lihotzky, Austrian architect, anti-Nazi activist (d. 2000)
- January 26 – Yakov Alksnis, Soviet aviator, commander of the Red Army Air Forces (d. 1938)
- January 28 – Ivan Stedeford, British industrialist (d. 1975)
- February 1 – Denise Robins, British romance novelist (d. 1985)
- February 4 – Ludwig Erhard, Chancellor of Germany (d. 1977)
- February 8 – Zakir Husain, Indian politician, 3rd President of India (d. 1969)
- February 9 – Charles Kingsford Smith, Australian aviator famous for his trans-Pacific flight (d. 1935)
- February 10
  - Judith Anderson, Australian-born British actress (d. 1992)
  - John Franklin Enders, American scientist, recipient of the Nobel Prize in Physiology or Medicine (d. 1985)
- February 19 – Elizabeth Rummel, German-Canadian mountaineer and environmental activist (d. 1980)
- February 21 – Celia Lovsky, Austrian-born American actress (d. 1979)
- February 25 – Peter Llewelyn Davies, British publisher, inspiration for Peter Pan (d. 1960)
- February 27
  - Marian Anderson, African-American contralto (d. 1993)
  - Ferdinand Heim, World War II German general (Scapegoat of Stalingrad) d. 1977)

=== March–April ===
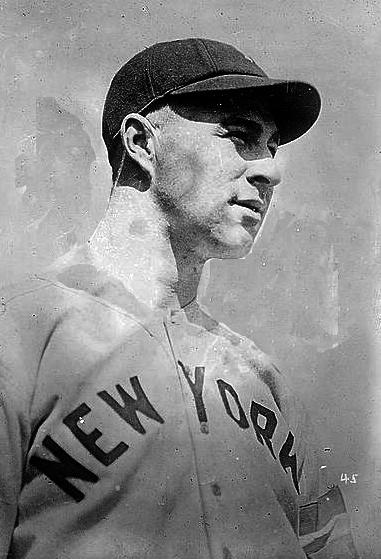
Lefty O'Doul

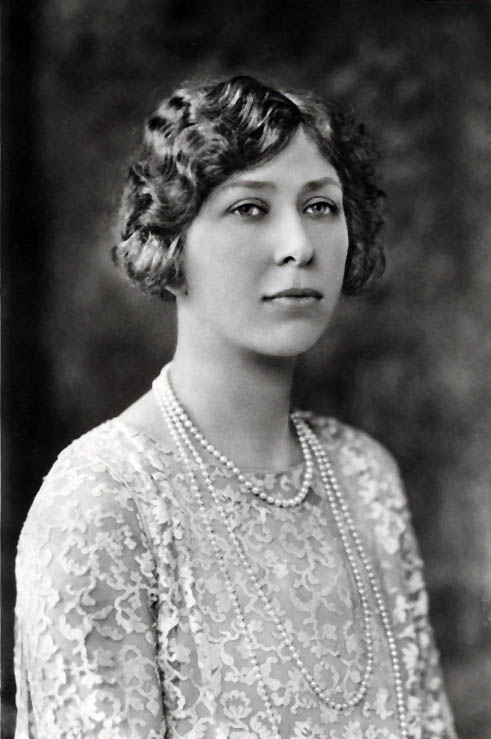
Princess Mary

- March 1 – Shoghi Effendi, Ottoman Guardian of the Bahá'í Faith (d. 1957)
- March 4 – Lefty O'Doul, American baseball player, restaurateur (d. 1969)
- March 5 – Set Persson, Swedish communist politician (d. 1960)
- March 11 – Henry Cowell, American avant-garde composer (d. 1965)
- March 16 – Flora Eldershaw, Australian novelist, critic, and historian (d. 1956)
- March 18 – John Langdon-Davies, British writer (d. 1971)
- March 19 – Betty Compson, American actress (d. 1974)
- March 24 – Wilhelm Reich, Austrian psychotherapist (d. 1957)
- March 28
  - Frank Hawks, American aviator (d. 1938)
  - Sepp Herberger, German football coach (d. 1977)
- March 31 – Oto Iskandar di Nata, Indonesian politician (d. 1945)
- April 7
  - Erich Löwenhardt, German World War I fighter ace (d. 1918)
  - Walter Winchell, American broadcast journalist (d. 1972)
- April 8 – Herbert Lumsden, British general (d. 1945)
- April 10 – Prafulla Chandra Sen, Indian politician and Chief Minister of West Bengal (d. 1990)
- April 13 – Werner Voss, German World War I fighter ace (d. 1917)
- April 17 – Thornton Wilder, American dramatist (d. 1975)
- April 19
  - Jiroemon Kimura, Japanese supercentenarian, world's longest lived man, last surviving man born in the 19th century and last surviving person born in 1897 (d. 2013)
  - Vivienne Segal, American actress (d. 1992)
- April 20 – Sudhakar Chaturvedi, Indian Vedic scholar and longevity claimant (d. 2020)
- April 21 – A. W. Tozer, American Protestant pastor (d. 1963)
- April 23 – Lester B. Pearson, 14th Prime Minister of Canada, recipient of the Nobel Peace Prize (d. 1972)
- April 24 – Manuel Ávila Camacho, Mexican general, politician, and 45th President of Mexico, 1940-1946 (d. 1955)
- April 25 – Mary, Princess Royal and Countess of Harewood, British princess (d. 1965)
- April 26
  - Eddie Eagan, American boxer, bobsledder (d. 1967)
  - Douglas Sirk, German film director (d. 1987)

=== May–June ===
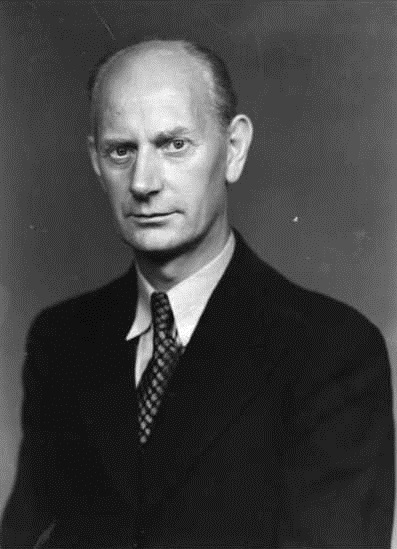
Einar Gerhardsen

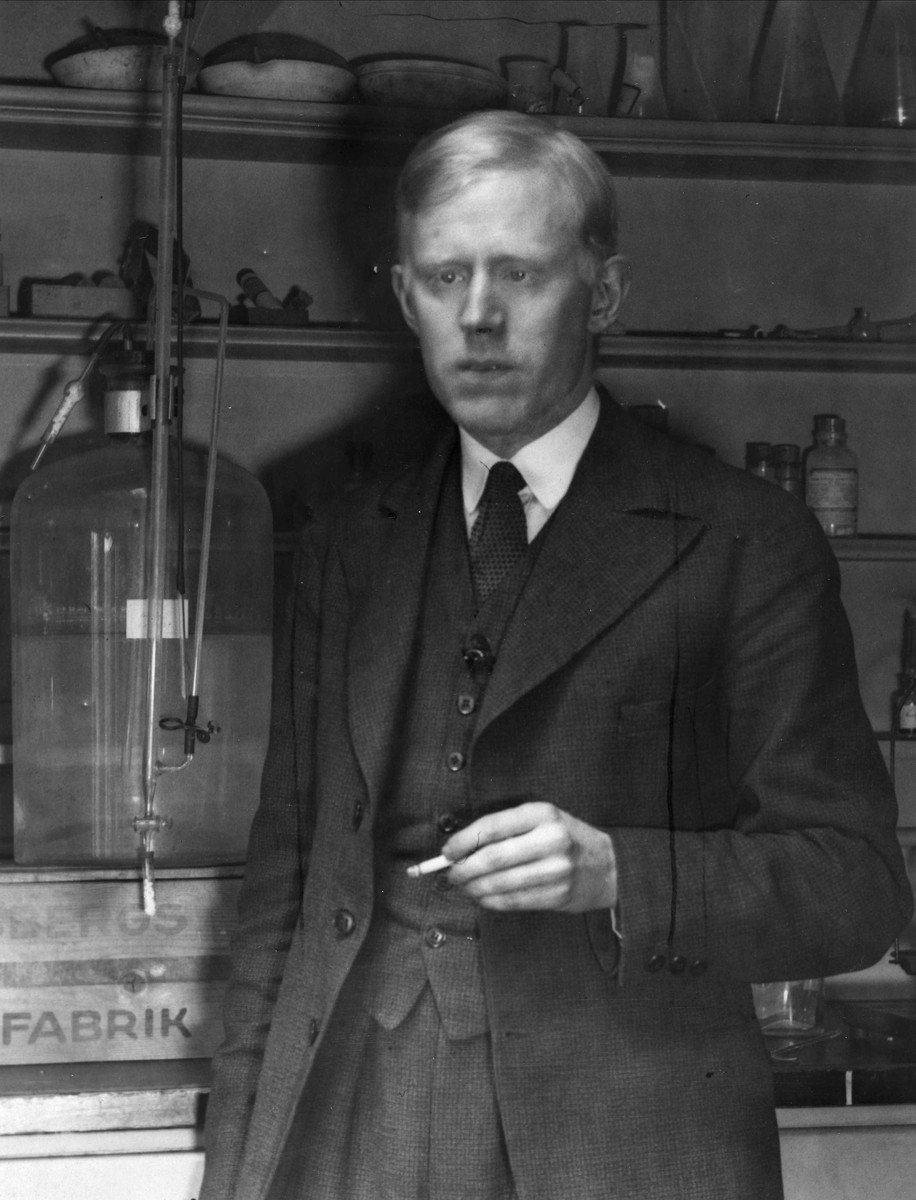
Odd Hassel

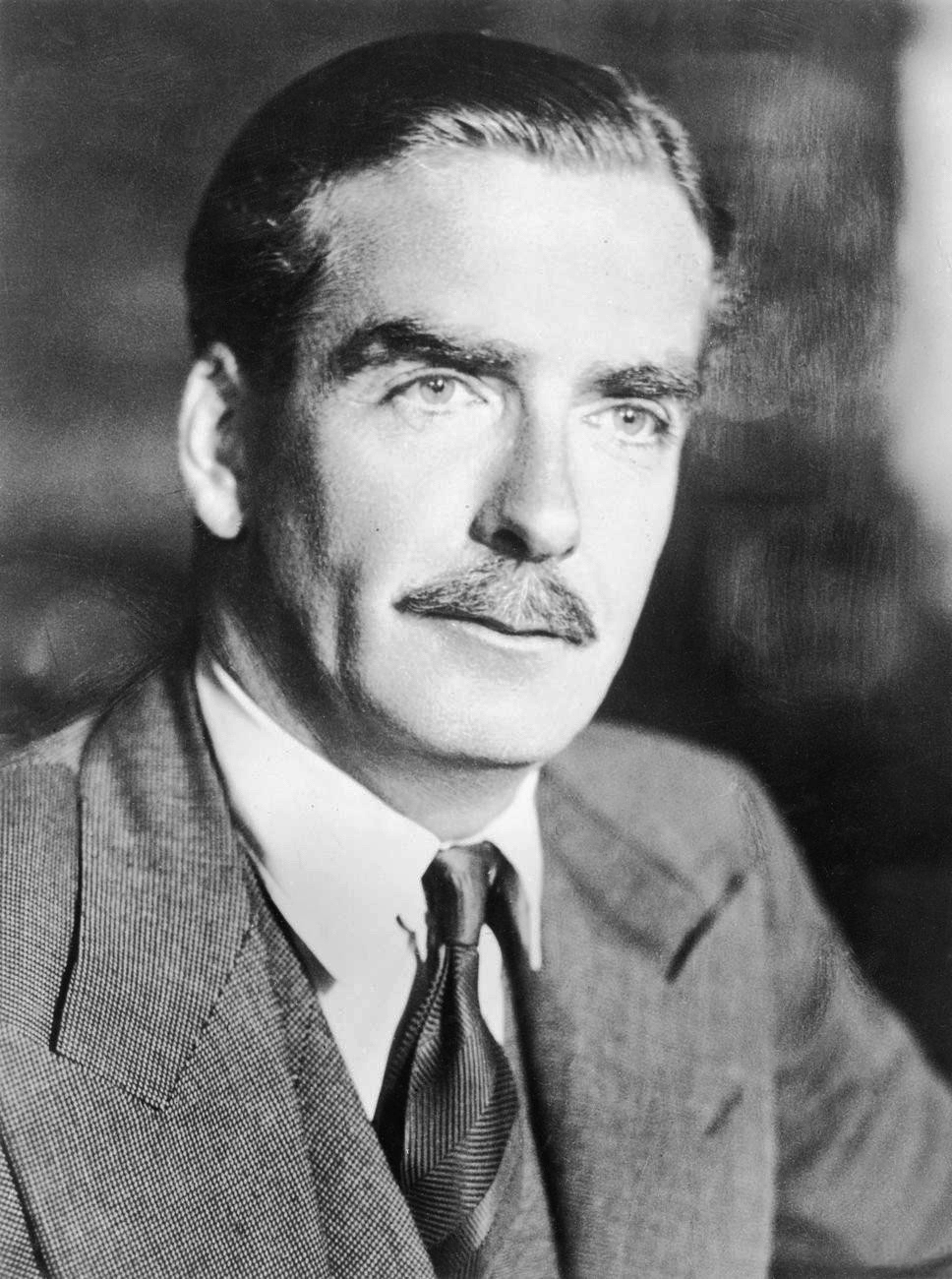
Anthony Eden

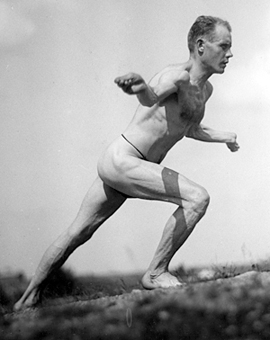
Paavo Nurmi

- May 2 – John Frederick Coots, American songwriter (d. 1985)
- May 4 – Phelps Phelps, 38th Governor of American Samoa, United States Ambassador to the Dominican Republic (d. 1981)
- May 10 – Einar Gerhardsen, 15th prime minister of Norway (d. 1987)
- May 12 – Earle Nelson, American serial killer and rapist (d. 1928)
- May 14 – Sidney Bechet, American-born jazz saxophonist (d. 1959)
- May 17
  - Laura Bromwell, American stunt pilot (d. 1921)
  - Odd Hassel, Norwegian chemist, Nobel Prize laureate (d. 1981)
- May 18 – Frank Capra, American film producer, director and writer (d. 1991)
- May 19 – Frank Luke, American World War I pilot (d. 1918)
- May 27 – John Cockcroft, English physicist, Nobel Prize laureate (d. 1967)
- May 29 – Erich Wolfgang Korngold, Austrian composer (d. 1957)
- June 2 – Tan Malaka, Indonesian teacher, philosopher, founder of Struggle Union and Murba Party, guerilla and fighter (d. 1949)
- June 5 – Charles Hartshorne, American philosopher, theologian and ornithologist (d. 2000)
- June 7
  - Kirill Meretskov, Soviet military officer, Marshal of the Soviet Union (d. 1968)
  - George Szell, Hungarian conductor (d. 1970)
- June 8
  - John G. Bennett, British mathematician (d. 1974)
  - Mariano Suárez, 27th president of Ecuador (d. 1980)
- June 10 – Grand Duchess Tatiana Nikolaevna of Russia (d. 1918)
- June 11 – Ram Prasad Bismil, Indian revolutionary (H.R.A. founder) (d. 1927)
- June 12 – Anthony Eden, Prime Minister of the United Kingdom (d. 1977)
- June 13 – Paavo Nurmi, Finnish runner (d. 1973)
- June 16 – Georg Wittig, German chemist, Nobel Prize laureate (d. 1987)
- June 19
  - Cyril N. Hinshelwood, English chemist, Nobel Prize laureate (d. 1967)
  - Moe Howard, American comedian, actor (The Three Stooges) (d. 1975)
- June 22
  - Norbert Elias, German sociologist (d. 1990)
  - Edmund A. Chester, American broadcaster, journalist (d. 1973)
- June 24 – Daniel K. Ludwig, American businessman; billionaire philanthropist (d. 1992)
- June 26 – Viola Dana, American actress (d. 1987)

=== July–August ===
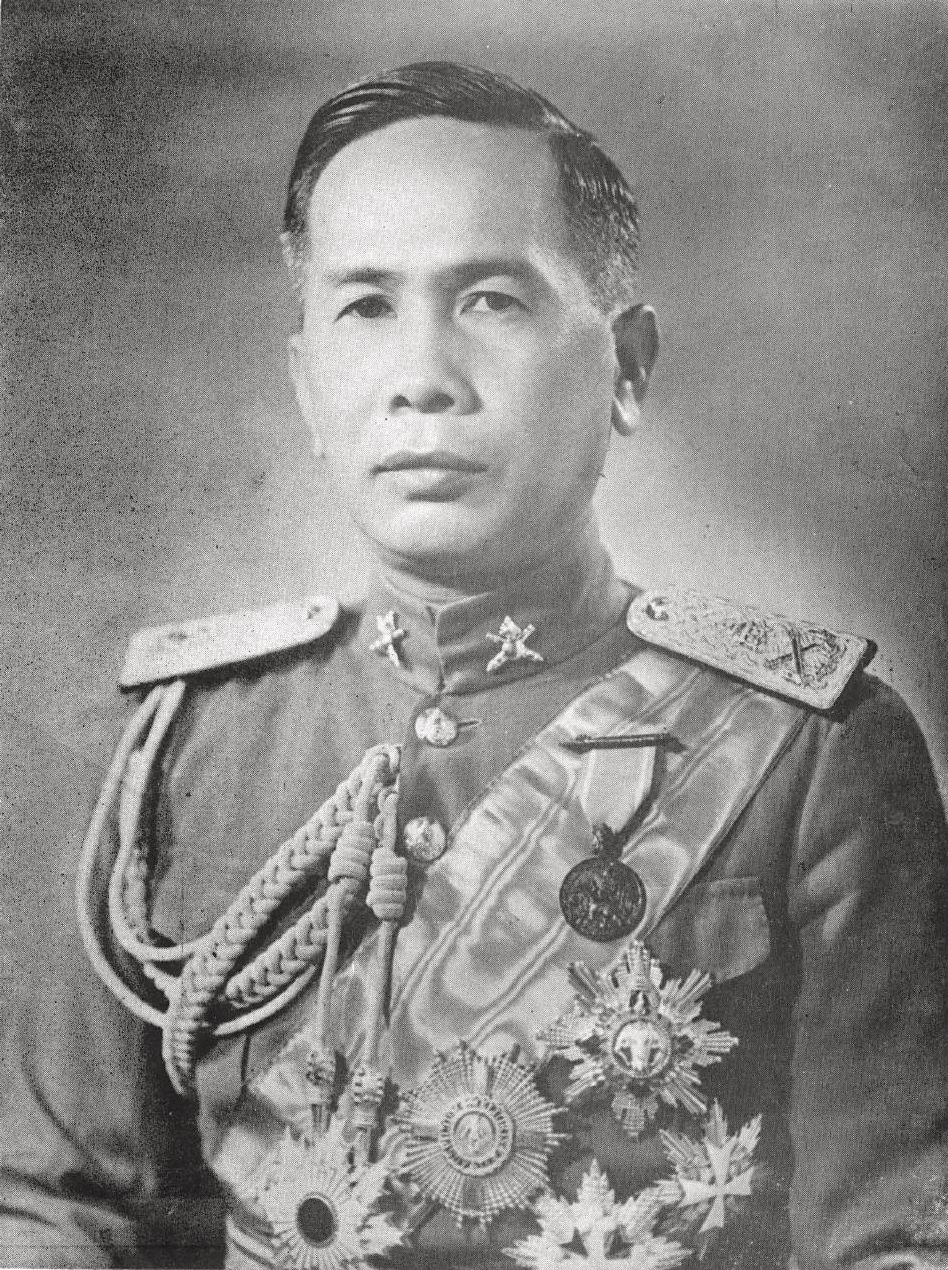
Plaek Phibunsongkhram

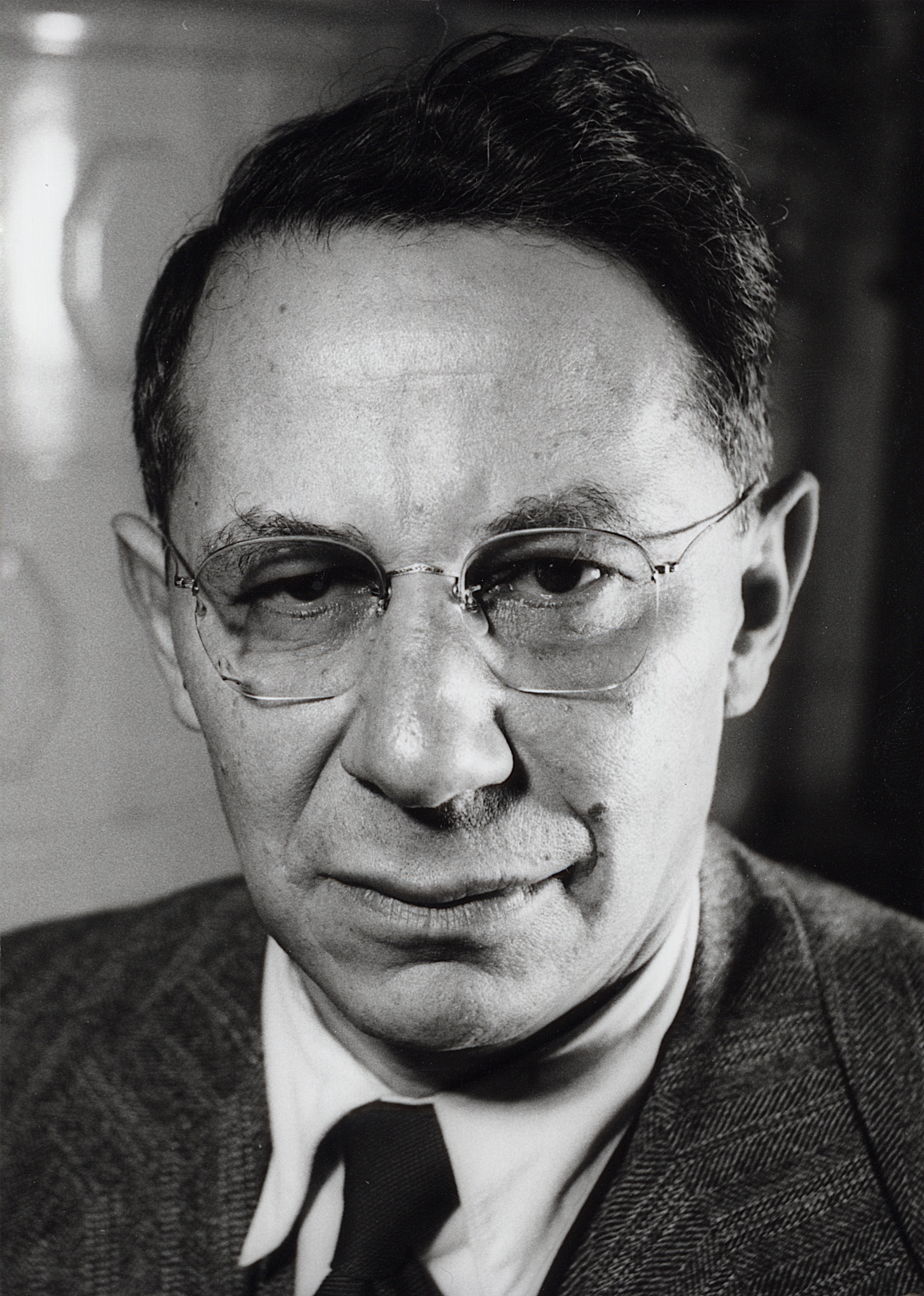
Tadeusz Reichstein

- July 1 – Bert Schneider, Canadian boxer (d. 1986)
- July 5 – Mogens Wöldike, Danish conductor (d. 1988)
- July 9 – Albert Coady Wedemeyer, American general (d. 1989)
- July 10 – John Gilbert, American actor (d. 1936)
- July 11 – Bull Connor, American civil rights opponent (d. 1973)
- July 14 – Plaek Phibunsongkhram, Thai field marshal, prime minister, and dictator (d. 1964)
- July 20 – Tadeusz Reichstein, Polish-born chemist, recipient of the Nobel Prize in Physiology or Medicine (d. 1996)
- July 24 – Amelia Earhart, American aviator (d. 1937)
- July 28 – James Fairbairn, Australian pastoralist, aviator, and politician (d. 1940)
- July 29 – Sir Neil Ritchie, British WWII general (d. 1983)
- August 4 – José Nucete Sardi, Venezuelan historian and diplomat (d. 1972)
- August 5 – Aksel Larsen, Danish politician (d. 1972)
- August 10 – Jack Haley, American actor (d. 1979)
- August 11 – Enid Blyton, British children's writer (d. 1968)
- August 15 – Jane Ingham, English botanist and scientific translator (d. 1982)
- August 16
  - Carlo Del Prete, Italian aviator (d. 1928)
  - Hersch Lauterpacht, Ukrainian-born international lawyer (d. 1960)
- August 22 – Elisabeth Bergner, Austrian actress (d. 1986)
- August 26 – Yun Posun, 2nd president of South Korea (d. 1990)
- August 31 – Fredric March, American actor (d. 1975)

=== September–October ===
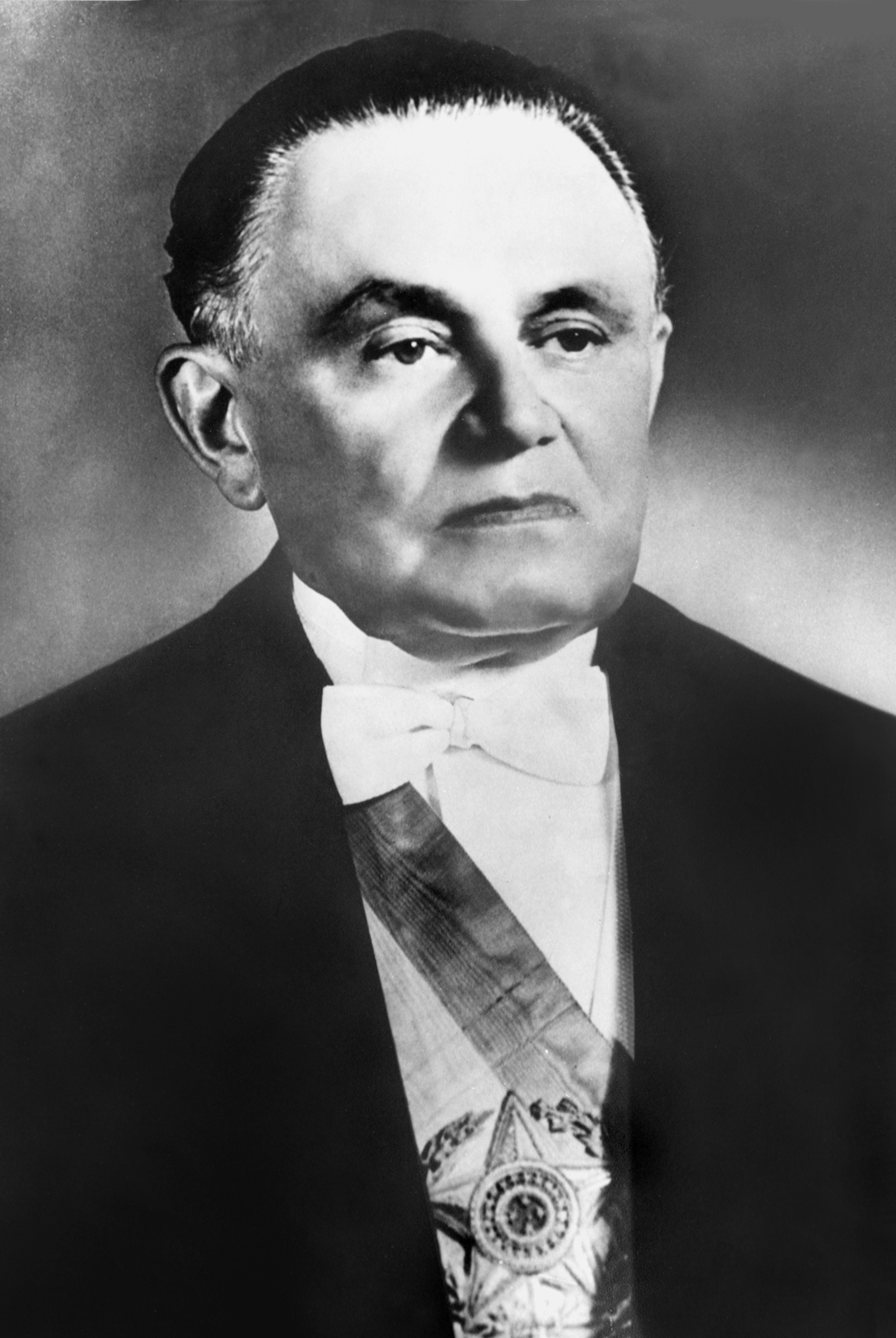
Humberto de Alencar Castelo Branco

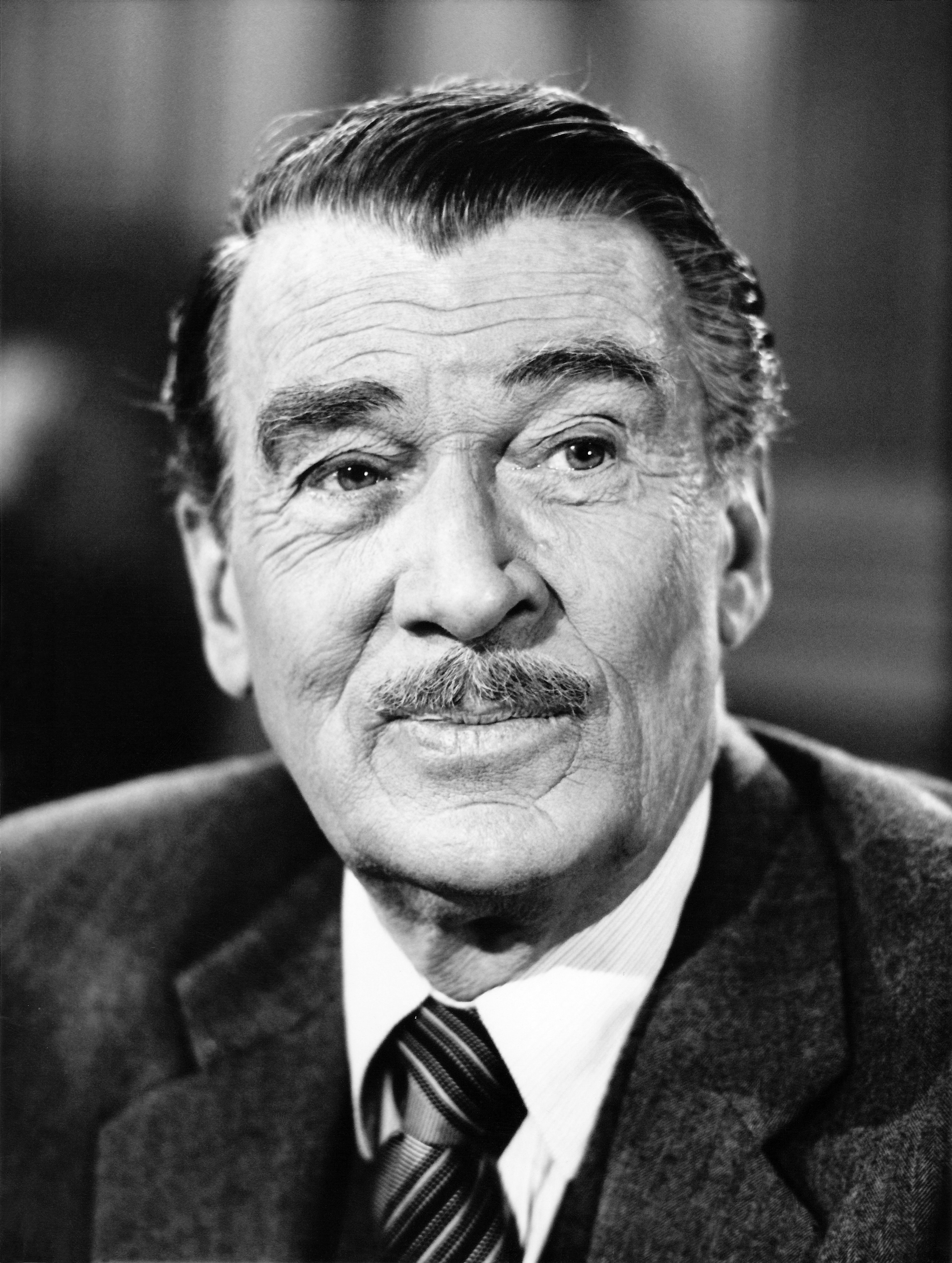
Walter Pidgeon

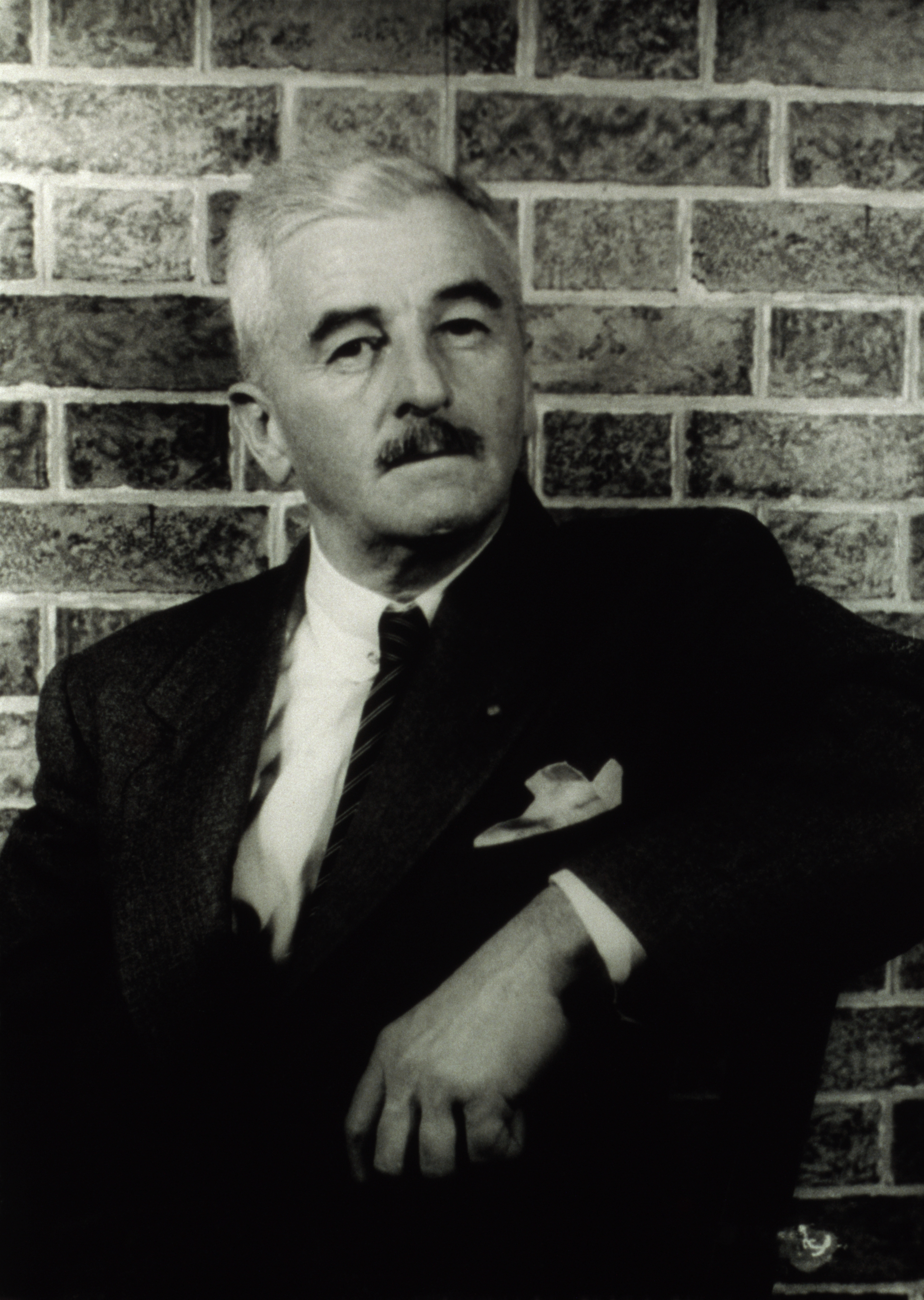
William Faulkner

- September 7 – Al Sherman, Russian-born American Tin Pan Alley songwriter (d. 1973)
- September 8 – Jimmie Rodgers, American singer (d. 1933)
- September 10 – Otto Strasser, German Nazi politician (d. 1974)
- September 12 – Irène Joliot-Curie, French physicist, recipient of the Nobel Prize in Chemistry (d. 1956)
- September 13 – Michel Saint-Denis, French-born actor, theatre director, drama theorist and radio broadcaster (d. 1971)
- September 15 – Kurt Daluege, German Nazi officer, war criminal (d. 1946)
- September 20 – Humberto de Alencar Castelo Branco, 26th President of Brazil (d. 1967)
- September 22 – Frank O'Connor, American actor, rancher, and painter (d. 1979)
- September 23 – Walter Pidgeon, Canadian actor (d. 1984)
- September 25 – William Faulkner, American writer, Nobel Prize laureate (d. 1962)
- September 26
  - Pope Paul VI (d. 1978)
  - Arthur Rhys-Davids, British World War I fighter ace (d. 1917)
- September 30 – Alfred Wintle, British army officer, eccentric (d. 1966)
- October 3 – Louis Aragon, French author (d. 1982)
- October 7 – Elijah Muhammad, African-American co-founder of the Nation of Islam (d. 1975)
- October 8 – Rouben Mamoulian, Armenian-American film, theatre director (d. 1987)
- October 15 – Johannes Sikkar, Estonian statesman (d. 1960)
- October 20 – Yi Un, Korean Crown Prince (d. 1970)
- October 28 – Edith Head, American costume designer (d. 1981)
- October 29 – Joseph Goebbels, German Nazi propagandist (d. 1945)
- October 30 – Agustín Lara, Mexican composer and interpreter of songs and boleros (d. 1970)

=== November–December ===
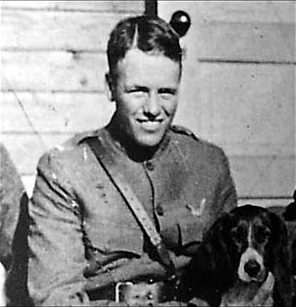
Quentin Roosevelt

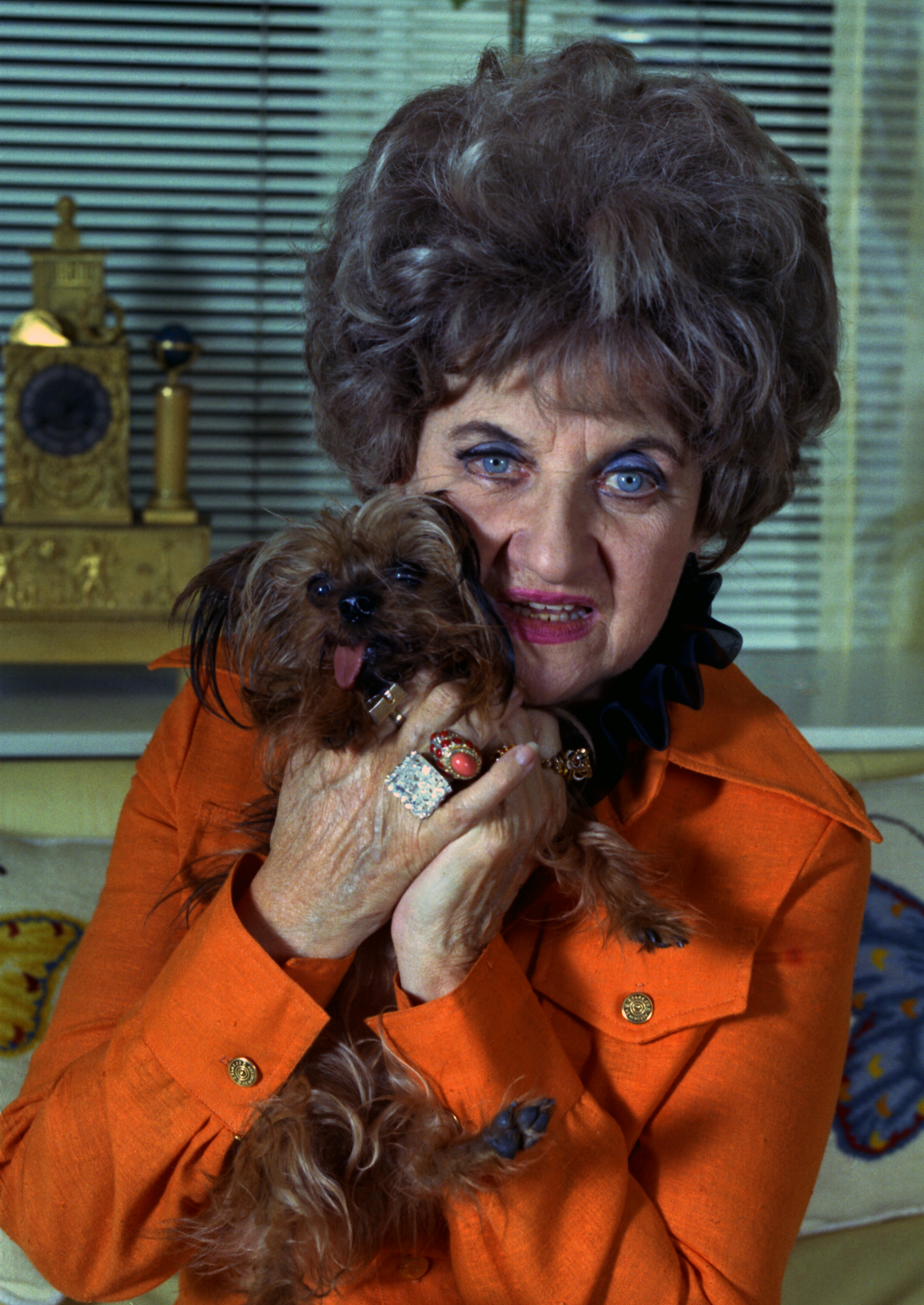
Hermione Gingold

- November 4 – Dmitry Pavlov, Soviet general (d. 1941)
- November 9 – Ronald George Wreyford Norrish, British chemist, Nobel Prize laureate (d. 1978)
- November 12 – Milward Simpson, American politician, governor and senator from Wyoming (d. 1993)
- November 15
  - Sir Sacheverell Sitwell, Bt, English author (d. 1988)
  - Aneurin Bevan, Welsh politician (d. 1960)
- November 18 – Patrick Blackett, Baron Blackett, English physicist, Nobel Prize laureate (d. 1974)
- November 19 – Quentin Roosevelt, youngest son of American President Theodore Roosevelt, killed in action as fighter pilot (d. 1918)
- November 23 – Nirad C. Chaudhuri, Bengali author (d. 1999)
- November 24 – Lucky Luciano, Sicilian-American Mafia boss Salvatore Lucania (d. 1962)
- November 26 – Robert Accard, French footballer (d. 1971)
- November 30 – Virginia Henderson, American nurse theorist (d. 1996)
- December 2 – Dean Alfange, American politician (d. 1989)
- December 5 – Gershom Scholem, German-born Israeli Jewish philosopher, historian (d. 1982)
- December 9 – Hermione Gingold, English actress (d. 1987)
- December 14
  - Kurt Schuschnigg, 11th Chancellor of Austria (d. 1977)
  - Margaret Chase Smith, American politician, U.S. Senator from Maine ( d. 1995 )
- December 18 – Fletcher Henderson, American musician (d. 1952)
- December 24 – Lazare Ponticelli, Italian-French supercentenarian; last surviving officially recognized French veteran of the First World War (d. 2008)
- December 31 – Rhys Williams, Welsh actor (d. 1969)

=== Date unknown ===
- Abd-al Karim, Afghan emir (d. 1927)
- Nisar Muhammad Yousafzai, Afghan revolutionary and decorated War Hero of the Afghan War of Independence (d. 1937)

== Deaths ==
=== January–June ===
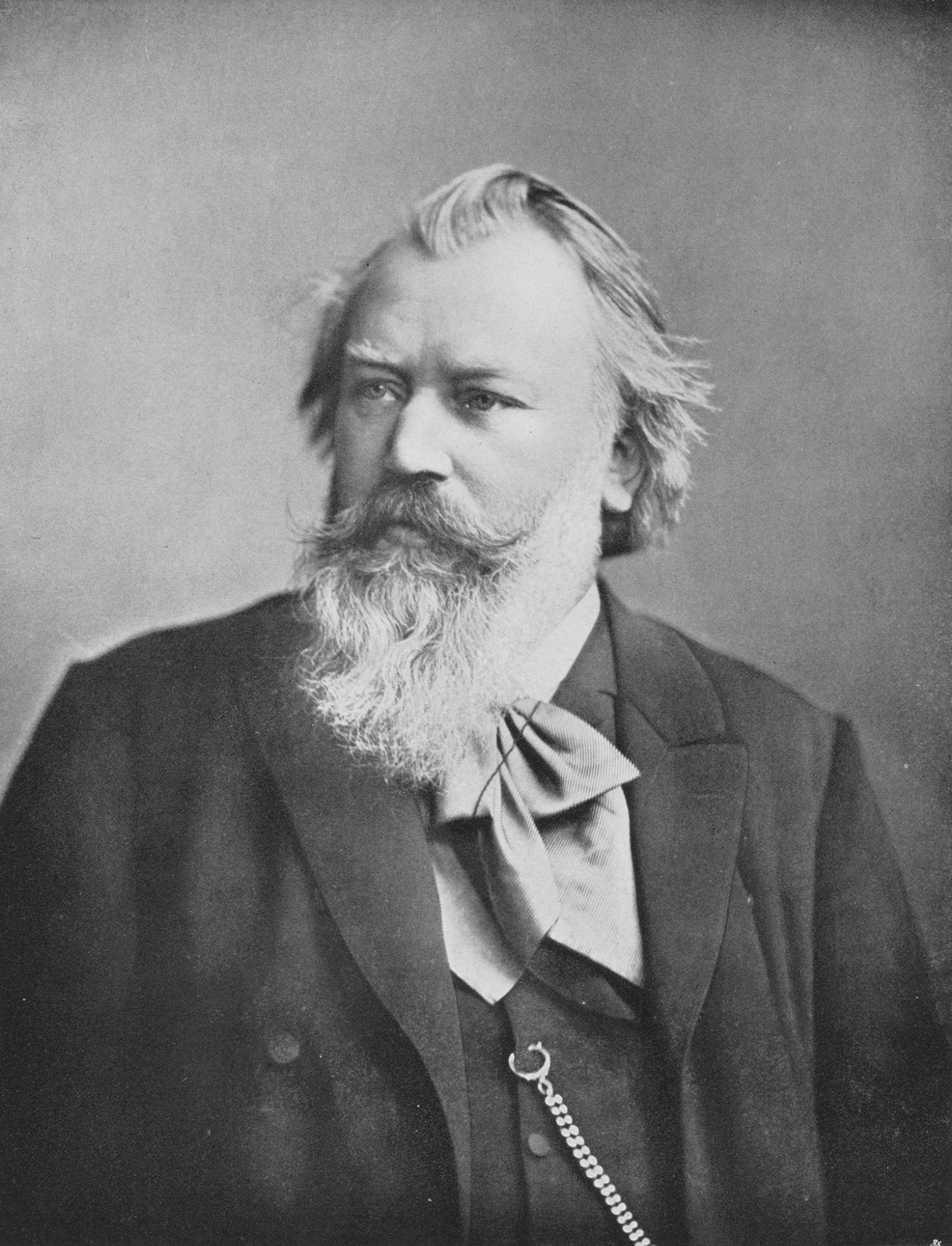
Johannes Brahms

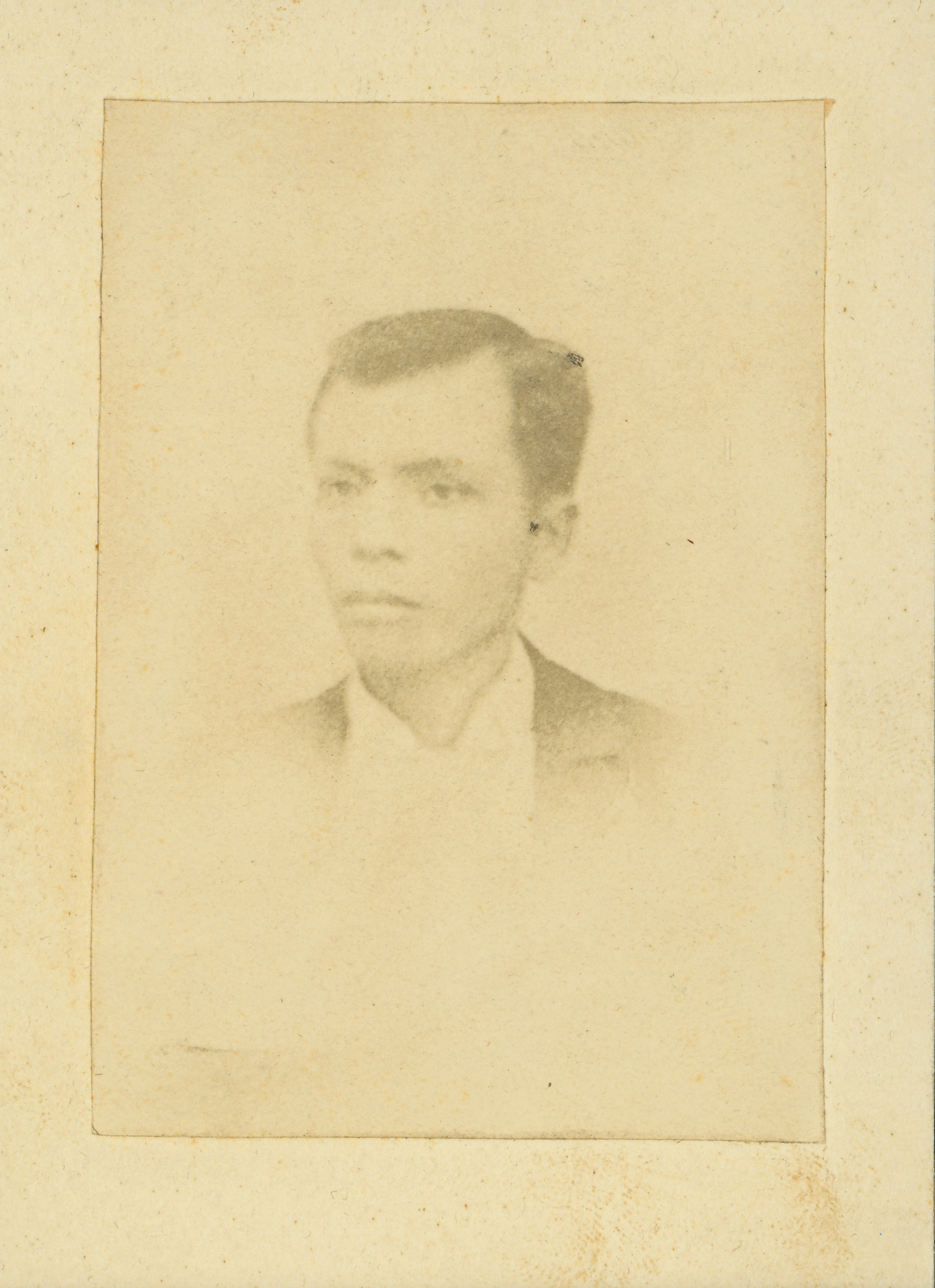
Andrés Bonifacio

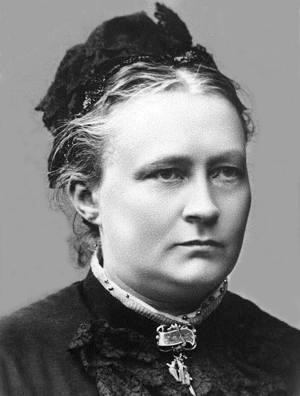
Minna Canth

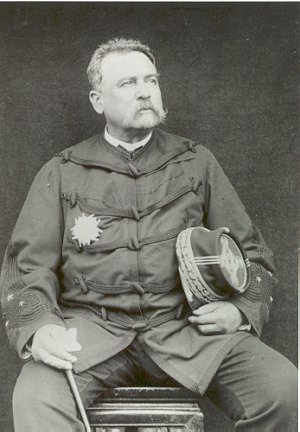
Louis Brière de l'Isle

- January 1 – Joseph S. Skerrett, American admiral (b. 1833)
- January 9 – Thomas Gwyn Elger, English astronomer (b. 1836)
- January 25 – Albion P. Howe, Union Army general (b. 1818)
- January 30 – Robert Themptander, 4th prime minister of Sweden (b. 1844)
- February 1 – Jeanne Merkus, Dutch deaconess, guerilla soldier and political activist (b. 1839)
- February 4 – Charles Bendire, U.S. Army captain, ornithologist (b. 1836)
- February 15 – Dimitrie Ghica, 10th prime minister of Romania (b. 1816)
- February 17 – Edmund Colhoun, American admiral (b. 1821)
- February 19 – Karl Weierstrass, German mathematician (b. 1815)
- March 3 – Nelson Wheatcroft, English actor, drama coach (b. 1852)
- March 6 – Sir Thomas Elder, Australian businessman and philanthropist (b. 1818)
- March 9 – Jamal ad-Din al-Afghani, Iranian teacher, writer (b. 1838)
- March 10 – Savitribai Phule, Indian social reformer and poet (b. 1831)
- March 11 – Henry Drummond, Scottish evangelical writer, lecturer (b. 1851)
- March 19 – Antoine Thomson d'Abbadie, Irish-born traveler (b. 1810)
- April 1 – Jandamarra, Australian Aboriginal insurrectionist (b. c. 1873)
- April 3 – Johannes Brahms, German composer (b. 1833)
- April 8 – Heinrich von Stephan, German postal director (b. 1831)
- April 10 – Frederick Francis III, Grand Duke of Mecklenburg-Schwerin (b. 1851)
- April 30 – A. Viola Neblett, American activist, suffragist, women's rights pioneer (b. 1842)
- May 3 – Sir Frederick Knight, British politician (b. 1812)
- May 4 – Duchess Sophie Charlotte in Bavaria (b. 1847)
- May 7
  - Ion Ghica, 3-time prime minister of Romania (b. 1816)
  - Henri d'Orléans, Duke of Aumale (b. 1822)
- May 10 – Andrés Bonifacio, Filipino revolutionary (b. 1863)
- May 12 – Minna Canth, Finnish writer and social activist (b. 1844)
- May 21 – Gregorio Luperón, Dominican revolutionary leader (b. 1839)
- May 23 – Pusapati Ananda Gajapati Raju, Indian rajah (b. 1850)
- June 17 – Sebastian Kneipp, German priest and naturopath (b. 1821)
- June 19 – Louis Brière de l'Isle, French general (b. 1827)

=== July–December ===
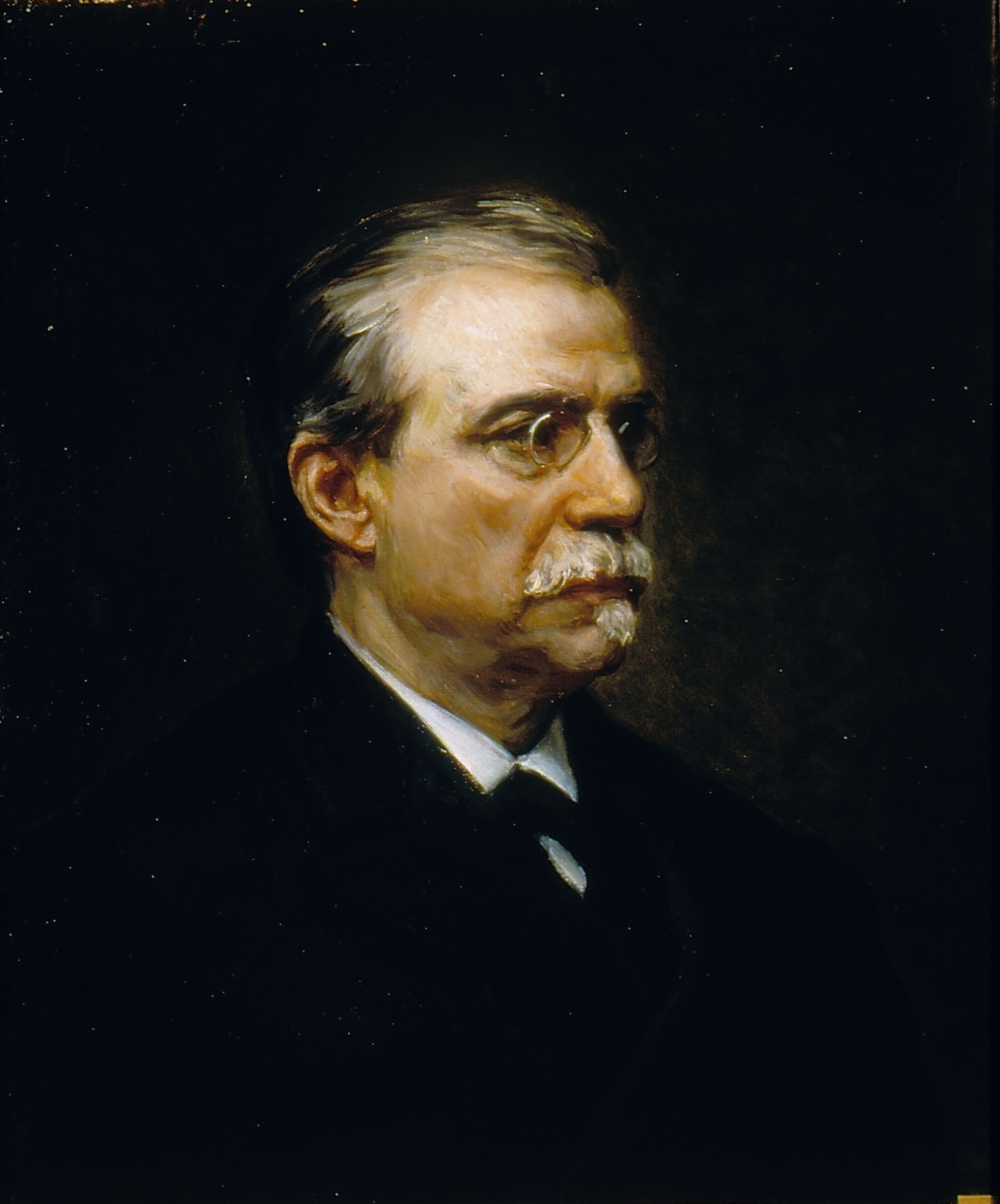
Antonio Cánovas del Castillo

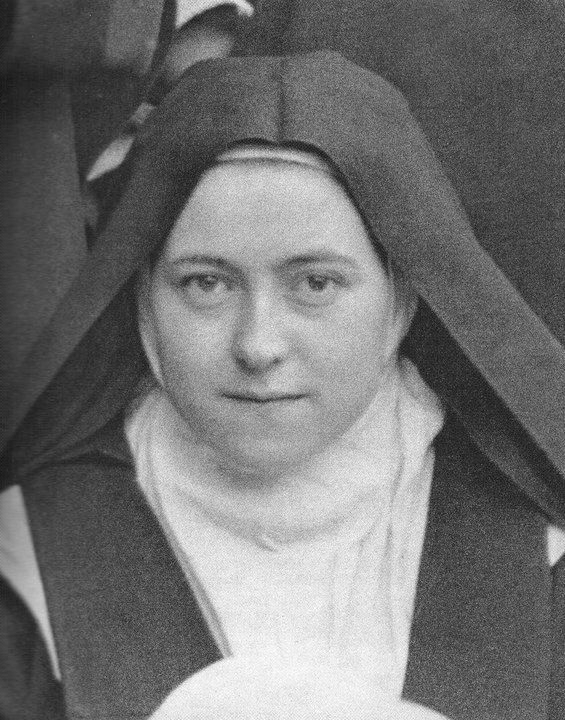
Saint Thérèse of Lisieux

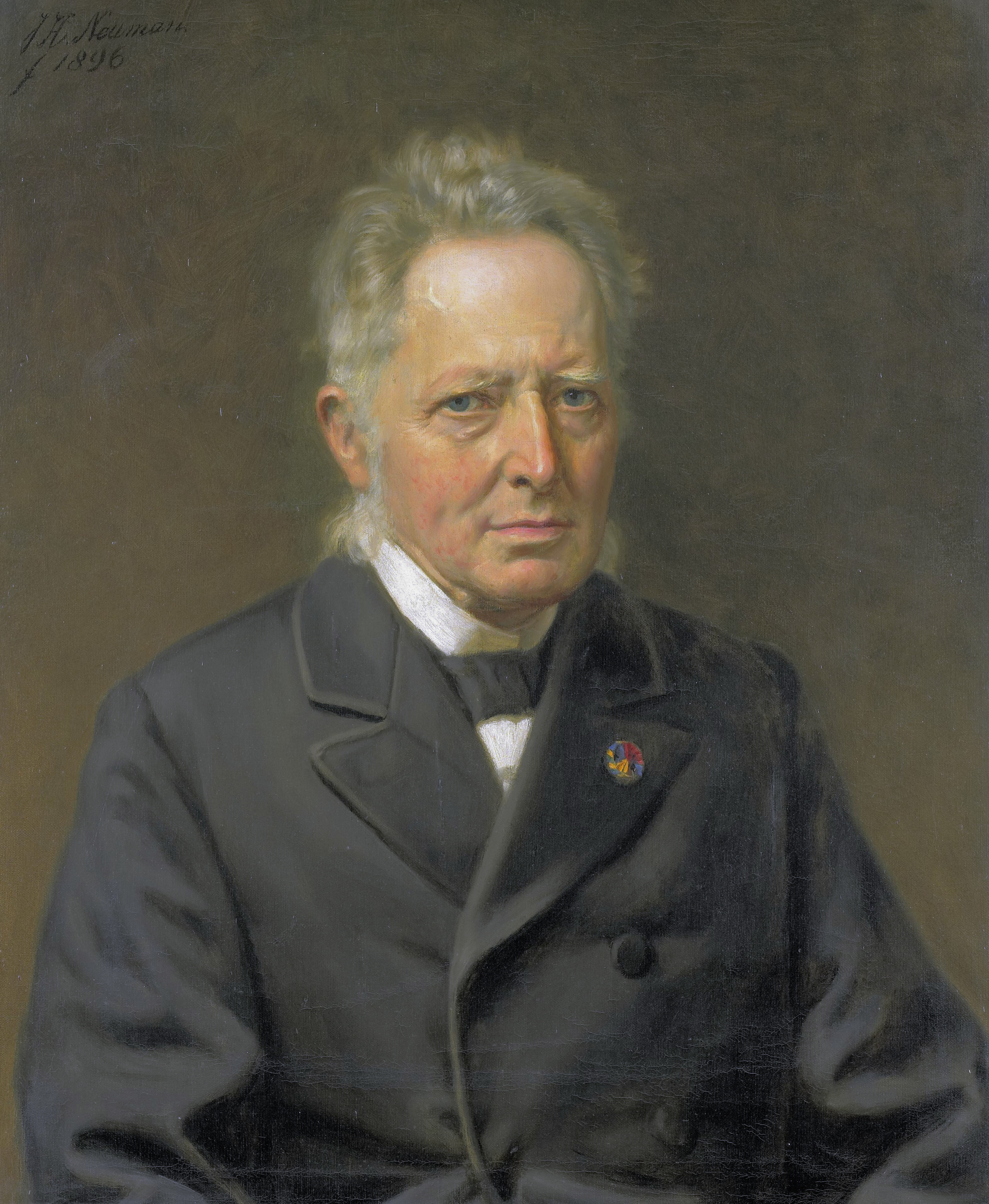
Jan Heemskerk

- July 1 – Ropata Wahawaha, New Zealand Māori military leader (b. c.1820)
- July 6
  - Tommy Burns, English diver (b. 1867 or 1868)
  - Celia Barrios de Reyna, First Mother of the Nation of Guatemala (b. 1834)
- August 8
  - Antonio Cánovas del Castillo, incumbent Prime Minister of Spain and historian (assassinated) (b. 1828)
  - Viktor Meyer, German chemist (b. 1848)
- August 17 – Sir William Jervois, British military engineer and diplomat (b. 1821)
- August 24
  - Sébastien Lespès, French admiral (b. 1828)
  - Mutsu Munemitsu, Japanese statesman, diplomat (b. 1844)
- August 31 – Louisa Lane Drew, English-born American actress, theater manager (b. 1820)
- September 9
  - Richard Holt Hutton, English writer, theologian (b. 1826)
  - Ferenc Pulszky, Hungarian politician (b. 1814)
- September 20 – Louis Pierre Mouillard, French artist and aviation pioneer (b. 1834)
- September 21 – Wilhelm Wattenbach, German historian (b. 1819)
- September 27
  - Charles-Denis Bourbaki, French military leader (b. 1816)
  - George M. Robeson, American politician (b. 1829)
- September 30 – Saint Thérèse of Lisieux, French Roman Catholic and Discalced Carmelite nun, saint (b. 1873)
- October 2 – Edward Maitland, British writer (b. 1824)
- October 3 – Yamaji Motoharu, Japanese general (b. 1841)
- October 9
  - John M. B. Clitz, American admiral (b. 1821)
  - Jan Heemskerk, Dutch politician, 16th Prime Minister of the Netherlands (b. 1818)
- October 13 – William Daniel, American temperance movement leader (b. 1826)
- October 19 – George Pullman, American inventor and industrialist (b. 1831)
- October 26 – John J. Robison, American politician in Michigan (b. 1824)
- October 27
  - Princess Mary Adelaide of Cambridge (b. 1833)
  - Carlos Antúnez González, Chilean politician (b. 1847)
  - Alexander Milton Ross, Canadian abolitionist, naturalist (b. 1832)
- October 28 – Hercules Robinson, 1st Baron Rosmead, British colonial governor (b. 1824)
- October 29 – Henry George, American economist (b. 1839)
- November – Francisco Gonzalo Marín, Cuban poet, freedom fighter (b. 1863)
- November 3 – Thomas Lanier Clingman, American "Prince of Politicians" (b. 1812)
- November 13 – Ernest Giles, Australian explorer (b. 1835)
- November 15 – Lucinda Barbour Helm, American women's religious activist (b. 1839)
- November 17 – George Hendric Houghton, American Protestant Episcopal clergyman (b. 1820)
- November 18 – Sir Henry Doulton, English pottery manufacturer (b. 1820)
- November 19 – William Seymour Tyler, American educator, historian (b. 1810)
- November 23 – Étienne Stéphane Tarnier, French obstetrician (b. 1828)
- December 14 – Robert Simpson, Scottish-Canadian businessman (b. 1834)
- December 16 – Alphonse Daudet, French writer (b. 1840)
- December 19 – Stanislas de Guaita, French poet (b. 1861)
- December 28 – William Corby, American Catholic priest (b. 1833)

=== Date unknown ===
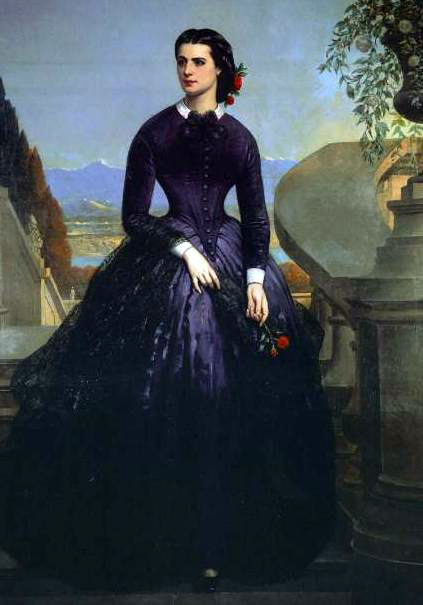
Isidora Goyenechea

- Isidora Goyenechea, Chilean industrialist, mine owner (b. 1836)
