= Cousino =

Cousino is a surname. Notable people with the surname include:

- Bernard Cousino (1902–1994), American audio technology inventor
- Brad Cousino (born 1953), American footballer

== See also ==
- Palacio Cousiño, a palace in Chile
