= Former embassy of Argentina in Chile =

National monument of Chile

Coordinates: 33°26′22″S 70°38′07″W

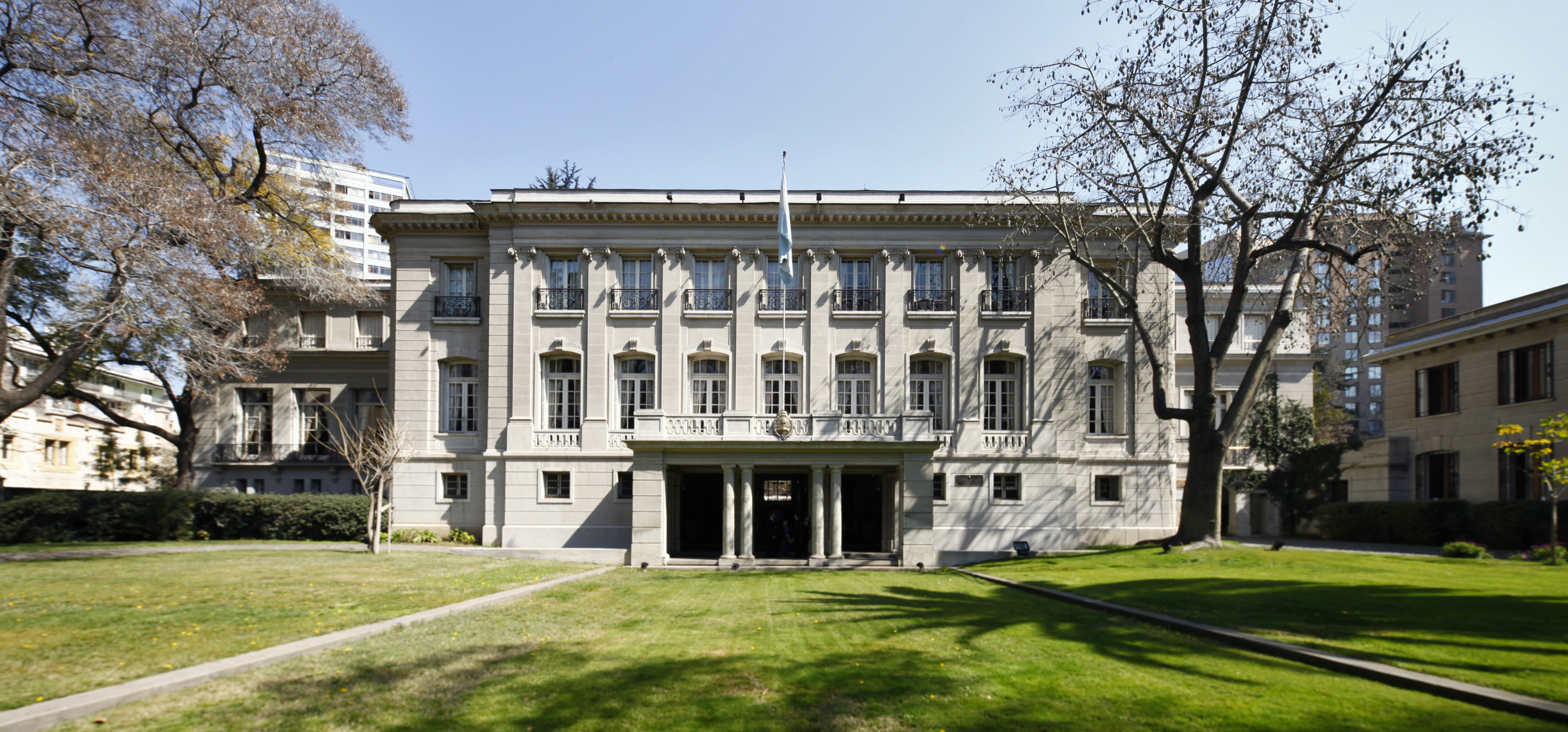
- Front facade
- Interactive map of Former embassy of Argentina in Chile

Design and construction
- Architects: Alfredo Johnson and Carlos Feuersein

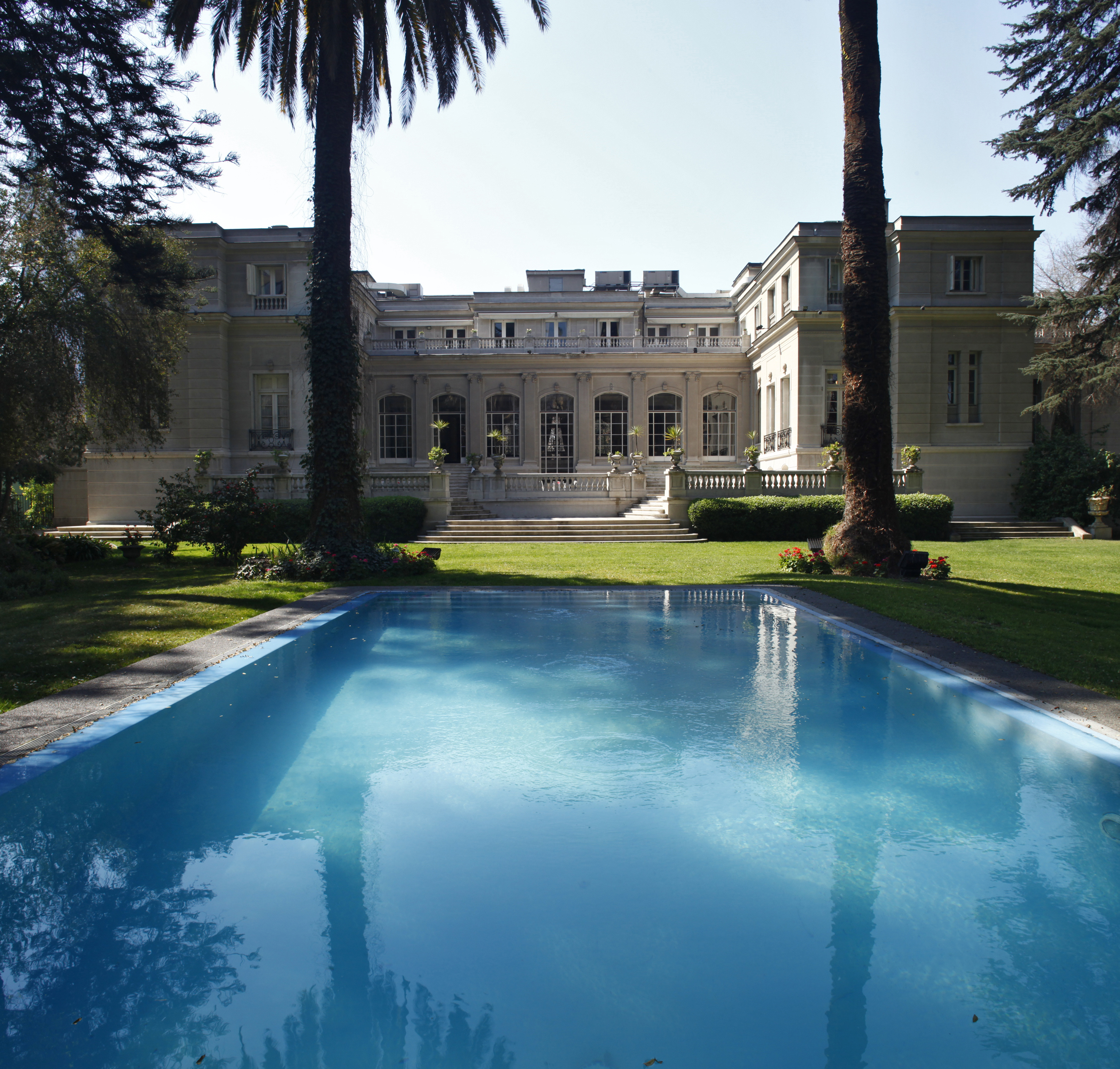
View of the rear facade

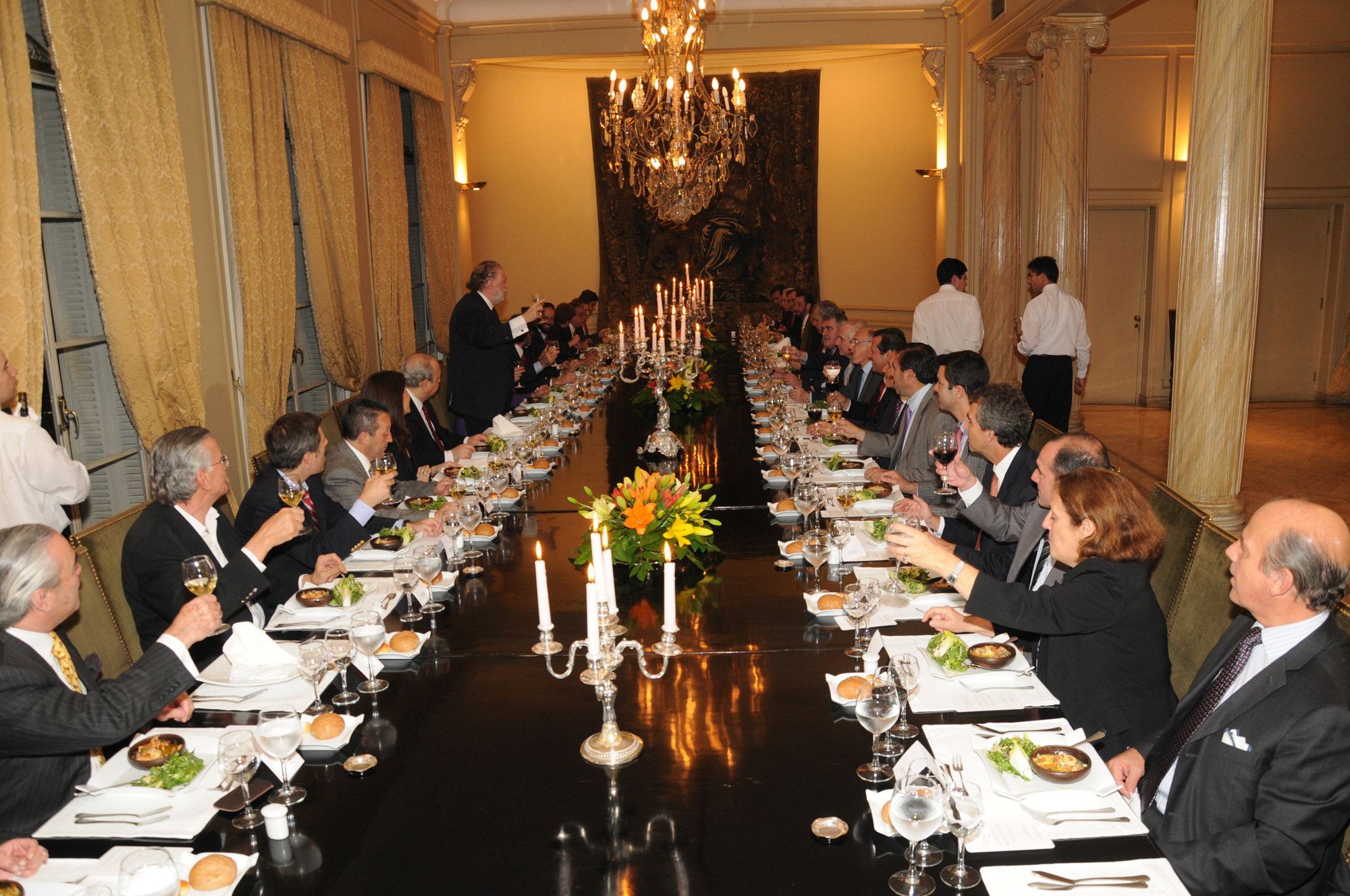
Reception to the Ambassador of Argentina in 2011.

The Former Embassy of Argentina in Chile is a building located at 41 Vicuña Mackenna Avenue, near the Plaza Baquedano, in downtown Santiago, Chile, housing the General Consulate of Argentina in Santiago. It was declared as a National Monument of Chile on July 24, 2003, within the category of Historic Monuments.

== History ==
On May 25, 1912, following a series of disagreements between Chile and Argentina, which concluded peacefully with the Abrazo del Estrecho (1899) and the Pactos de Mayo (1902), the Chilean government granted a plot of land to Argentina as an act of reciprocity. It is located on Avenida Vicuña Mackenna, known then as Camino de Cintura. Reciprocally, on September 18 of that year, Argentina granted to Chile a palace on Esmeralda Street in Buenos Aires.

The location of the property was at what was then the edge of the city, and the property was close to the old Hospital de San Borja and the former Pirque railway station. The site was the location of a chalet owned by the Nieto family and the headquarters for a tennis club, which served as the residence of the Ambassador and chancery of Argentina until July 7, 1943, when a fire destroyed the buildings. The mayor of the city offered the Palacio Cousiño or the Club Militar to house the Argentine diplomatic delegation, but they preferred to be temporarily accommodated in the Hotel Carrera.

The government of Chile, through the Ministry of Public Works, undertook the rebuilding of the diplomatic facility, hosting an open competition whose winning design was submitted by architects Alfredo Johnson and Carlos Feuersein. The building was inaugurated on May 25, 1959.

== Description ==
Located at the center of the lot, the three-story building was built in the Neoclassical style influenced by the Beaux-Arts de Paris. The property features a backyard with a swimming pool. The French-style building has a large room with five entrance doors. Its western facade is notable for its large windows, and there is a terrace adjacent to the dining room.
