= Elizabeth Rummel =

German-Canadian environmentalist (1897–1980)

- Born: Elizabet von Rummel; February 19, 1897; Munich, Germany
- Died: October 10, 1980 (aged 83); Canmore, Alberta
- Other name: Lizzie Rummel
- Occupations: Mountaineer; Ski lodge operator; Oral history interviewer
- Awards: Member of the Order of Canada

Elizabeth von Rummel (February 19, 1897 – October 10, 1980) was a German-Canadian environmentalist and mountaineer. In 1980, she was made a Member of the Order of Canada.

== Biography ==
Rummel was born Baroness Elizabet von Rummel in Munich, Germany on February 19, 1897. Her father, Baron Gustav von Rummel, was an actor and an officer in the German army while her mother was descended from a wealthy publishing family. Her parents divorced when she was young.

Rummel, her mother, and her sister came to Canada for summer vacations starting in 1911. Rummel attended the first Calgary Stampede in 1912. On their 1914 vacation to Alberta, the family was unable to return to Germany due to the sudden outbreak of World War I. The Rummels permanently moved to Millarville, Alberta, Canada. Rummel spent much of her early life helping out on the family ranch in Millarville. Aside from a brief return to Germany in 1919 to care for her dying grandmother, Rummel spent the majority of her life after the war in Canada.

In 1938, Rummel moved to the mountains of Alberta where she began working in early skiing and backcountry operations. Rummel was employed by various ski lodges including Mount Assiniboine Lodge, Skoki Lodge, Temple Chalet and Lake Louise Ski Lodge, and Sunburst Lake Camp which she owned and operated from 1950 to 1970. While working at Skoki Lodge, Rummel adopted the nickname Lizzie. Rummel is credited with inspiring summer heli accessed hiking at Canadian Mountain Holidays Cariboo. Rummel was a member of the Alpine Club of Canada. In 1970, due to worsening arthritis Rummel sold Sunburst Lake Camp, retired, and moved to Canmore, Alberta.

From 1966 until her death in 1980, Rummel worked as an oral history interviewer and assistant at the Archives of the Canadian Rockies (now called the Archives of the Whyte Museum of the Canadian Rockies). She died on October 10, 1980.

== Awards ==
On December 17, 1979, Rummel was appointed to the Order of Canada. Her formal investiture as a member happened in April 1980. Rummel was made a member of the order of Canada for her mountaineering and environmental contributions as well as for "enrich[ing] her country by sharing her deep love of the Rocky Mountains with all who meet her."

== Legacy ==
The Elizabeth Rummel School in Canmore, Alberta, an elementary school serving children from kindergarten to grade 3 is named after Rummel. The Elizabeth Rummel School is part of the Canadian Rockies Public Schools. Rummel Lake and Rummel Pass, both in Kananaskis County, are also named after Rummel. Elizabeth Lake, near Cranbrook, British Columbia, is named after Rummel as well.

Rummel's life is recounted in the 1983 novel Lizzie Rummel: Baroness of the Canadian Rockies by Rummel's friend Ruth Oltmann. In 2019, Rummel's story was adapted into a one-woman show, "A Woman in Wildflowers", written and performed by Shirley Truscott. "A Woman in Wildflowers" was the third one-woman show in Truscott's "Mountain Women" plays.
