= Isidora Goyenechea =

Chilean industrialist (1836-1897)

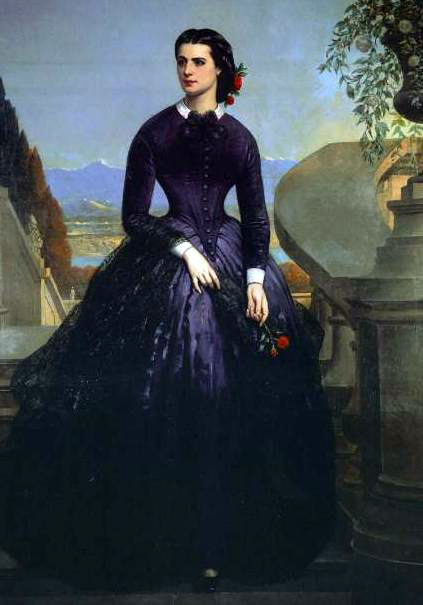
- Isidora Goyenechea portrayed by Joseph-Désiré Court.
- Born: 1836; Copiapo, Chile
- Died: 1897 (aged 60–61); Paris, France
- Occupation: Industrialist

Isidora Goyenechea Gallo (1836-1897) was a Chilean industrialist.

She inherited her business from her late spouse Luis Cousiño (1835-1873).

She owned and managed the coal mines in Lota and Coronel, the silver mines of Chañarcillo, the vineyard Viña Cousiño Macul and had her own trade fleet, and was at the time regarded as one of the richest people in the world. Her house was in the current one Palacio Cousiño in Santiago de Chile.

She founded the O'Higgins Park.
