= Palacio Cousiño =

Palace in Santiago, Chile

Coordinates: 33°27′7.89″S 70°39′23.80″W

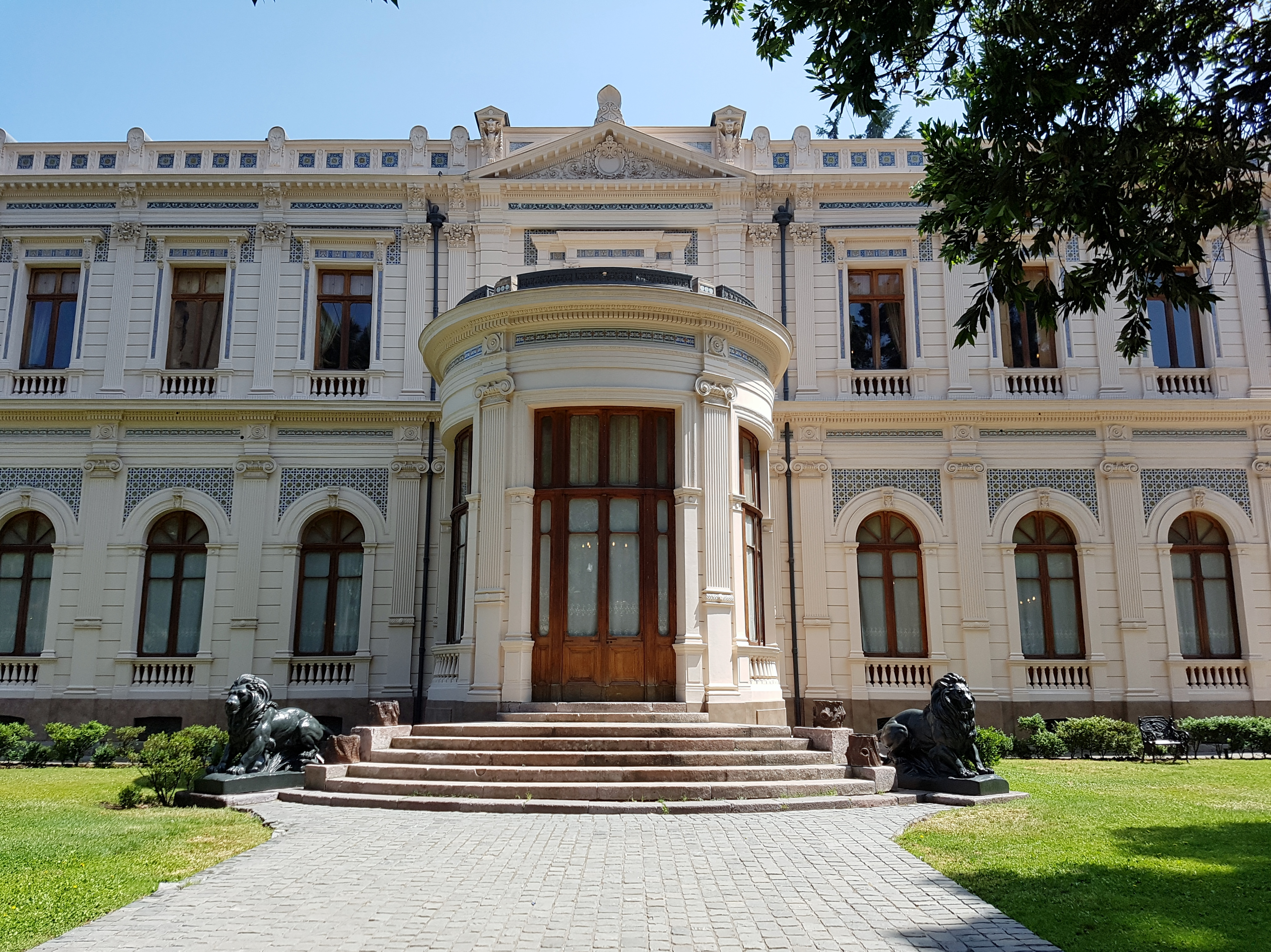
Palacio Cousiño.

The Palacio Cousiño is a palace that was designed and built for Isidora Goyenechea, widow of Luis Cousiño, who in turn was son of Matías Cousiño. It is located at 438 Dieciocho Street in Santiago, Chile.

The palace was designed by architect Paul Lathoud, who also designed the building housing the Chilean National Museum of Natural History. The palace was constructed in Second Empire Style and completed in 1878.
