= Pandiatonicism =

Musical technique

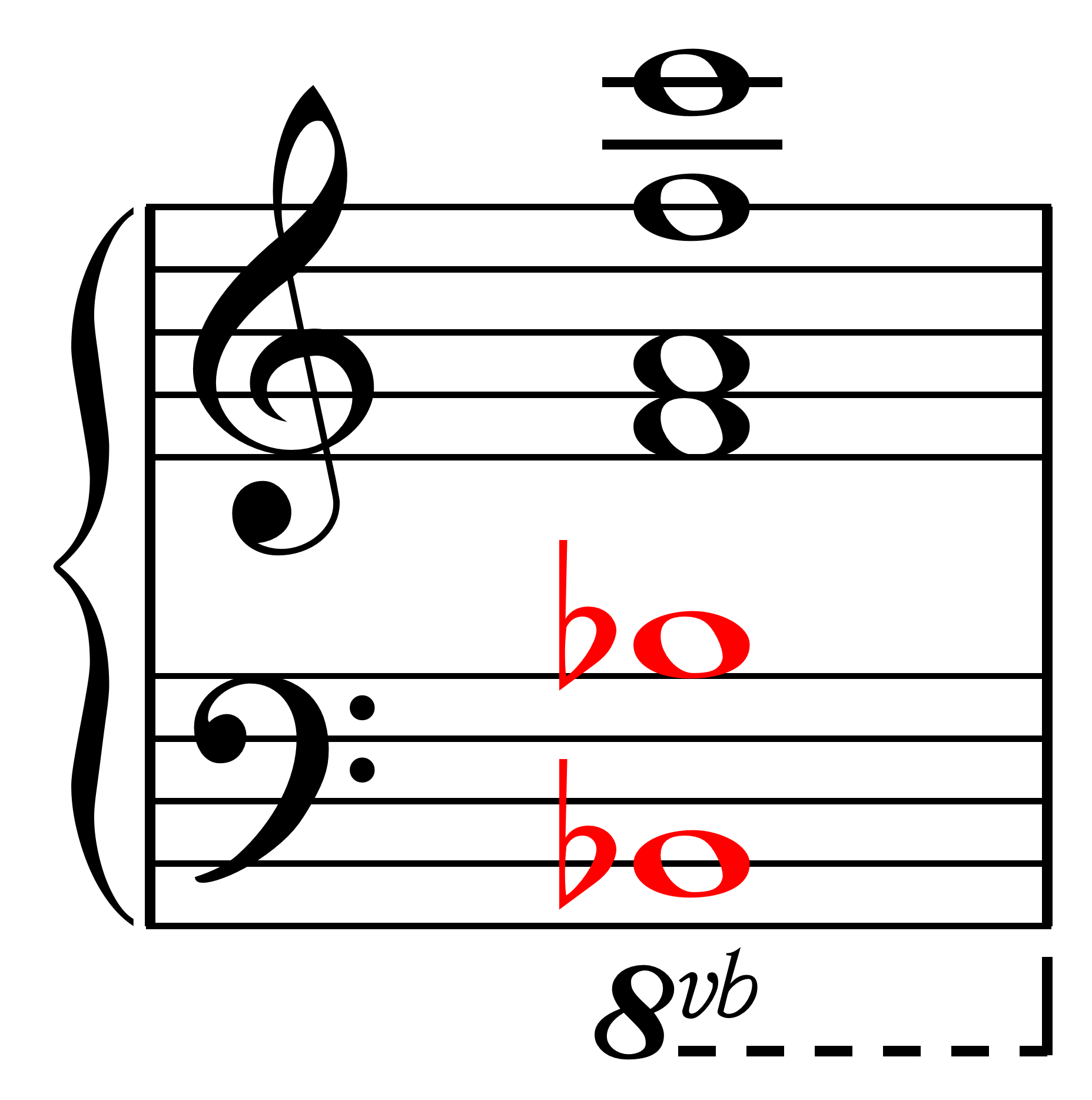
Pandiatonic chord from Stravinsky's Symphony of Psalms 3rd movement

Pandiatonicism is a musical technique of using the diatonic (as opposed to the chromatic) scale without the limitations of functional tonality. Music using this technique is pandiatonic.

== History ==
The term "pandiatonicism" was coined by Nicolas Slonimsky in the second edition of Music since 1900 to describe chord formations of any number up to all seven degrees of the diatonic scale, "used freely in democratic equality". Triads with added notes such as the sixth, seventh, or second (added tone chords) are the most common,) while the "most elementary form" is a nonharmonic bass. According to Slonimsky's definition,

Pan-diatonicism sanctions the simultaneous use of any or all seven tones of the diatonic scale, with the bass determining the harmony. The chord-building remains tertian, with the seventh, ninth, or thirteenth chords being treated as consonances functionally equivalent to the fundamental triad. (The eleventh chord is shunned in tonic harmony because of its quartal connotations.) Pan-diatonicism, as consolidation of tonality, is the favorite technique of NEO-CLASSICISM.

Pandiatonic music typically uses the diatonic notes freely in dissonant combinations without conventional resolutions and/or without standard chord progressions, but always with a strong sense of tonality due to the absence of chromatics. "Pandiatonicism possesses both tonal and modal aspects, with a distinct preference for major keys". Characteristic examples include the opening of Sergei Prokofiev's Piano Concerto No. 3, Alfredo Casella's Valse diatonique, and Igor Stravinsky's Pulcinella. "The functional importance of the primary triads...remains undiminished in pandiatonic harmony". An opposed point of view holds that pandiatonicism does not project a clear and stable tonic. Pandiatonicism is also referred to as "white-note music," (in reference to the piano keyboard) though in fact occasional accidentals may be present. Other composers who employed the technique are Maurice Ravel, Paul Hindemith, Darius Milhaud, Aaron Copland, and Roy Harris. Pandiatonicism is also employed in jazz (e.g., added sixth ninth chord) and in Henry Cowell's tone clusters.

Slonimsky later came to regard pandiatonicism as a diatonic counterpart of Arnold Schoenberg's twelve-tone technique, whereby melodies may be made up of seven different notes of the diatonic scale, and then be inverted, retrograded, or both. According to this system, "strict pandiatonic counterpoint" may use progressions of seven different notes in each voice, with no vertical duplication.

The term has been criticized as one of many by which, "Stravinsky's music, everywhere and at once, is made to represent or encompass every conceivable technique", and that has, "become so vague a concept that it has very little meaning or use". Pandiatonic music is usually defined by what it is not, "by the absence of traditional elements": chromatic, atonal, twelve-tone, functional, clear tonic, and/or traditional dissonance resolutions. "It has been applied...to diatonic music lacking harmonic consistency [or]...centricity". Slonimsky himself, making fun of the definition, quoted a professor calling pandiatonicism "C-major that sounds like hell".

Examples of pandiatonicism include the harmonies Aaron Copland used in his populist work, Appalachian Spring, and the minimalist music by Steve Reich, Philip Glass, and the later works of John Adams. William Mann describes The Beatles' "This Boy" as, "harmonically...one of their most intriguing, with its chains of pandiatonic clusters".

== Pandiatonic music ==
The following musical works include pandiatonicism.

- The Beatles
  - "She's Leaving Home"
  - "This Boy"
- Alfredo Casella
  - Valse Diatonique (On the White Keys), op. 35 No. 2
- Aaron Copland
  - Appalachian Spring
- Claude Debussy
  - "La cathédrale engloutie" from Préludes, book 1
  - La Damoiselle élue
  - "Voiles"
- George Gershwin
  - Variations on "I Got Rhythm"
- Constant Lambert
  - Trois pièces nègres pour les touches blanches
- Edward McGuire
  - Twelve White-note Pieces for piano, 1971
- Georgs Pelēcis
  - Concertino Bianco for piano and chamber orchestra
- Maurice Ravel
  - Rigaudon, from Le Tombeau de Couperin
- Steve Reich
  - The Desert Music
  - Tehillim
- Ned Rorem
  - String Quartet No. 2
- Déodat de Séverac
  - "Temps de neige"
- Igor Stravinsky
  - Concerto for Piano and Wind Instruments
- Heitor Villa-Lobos
  - String Quartet No. 10

== See also ==
- Nonchord tone
