= Ce qu'a vu le vent d'ouest =

Piano composition by Claude Debussy

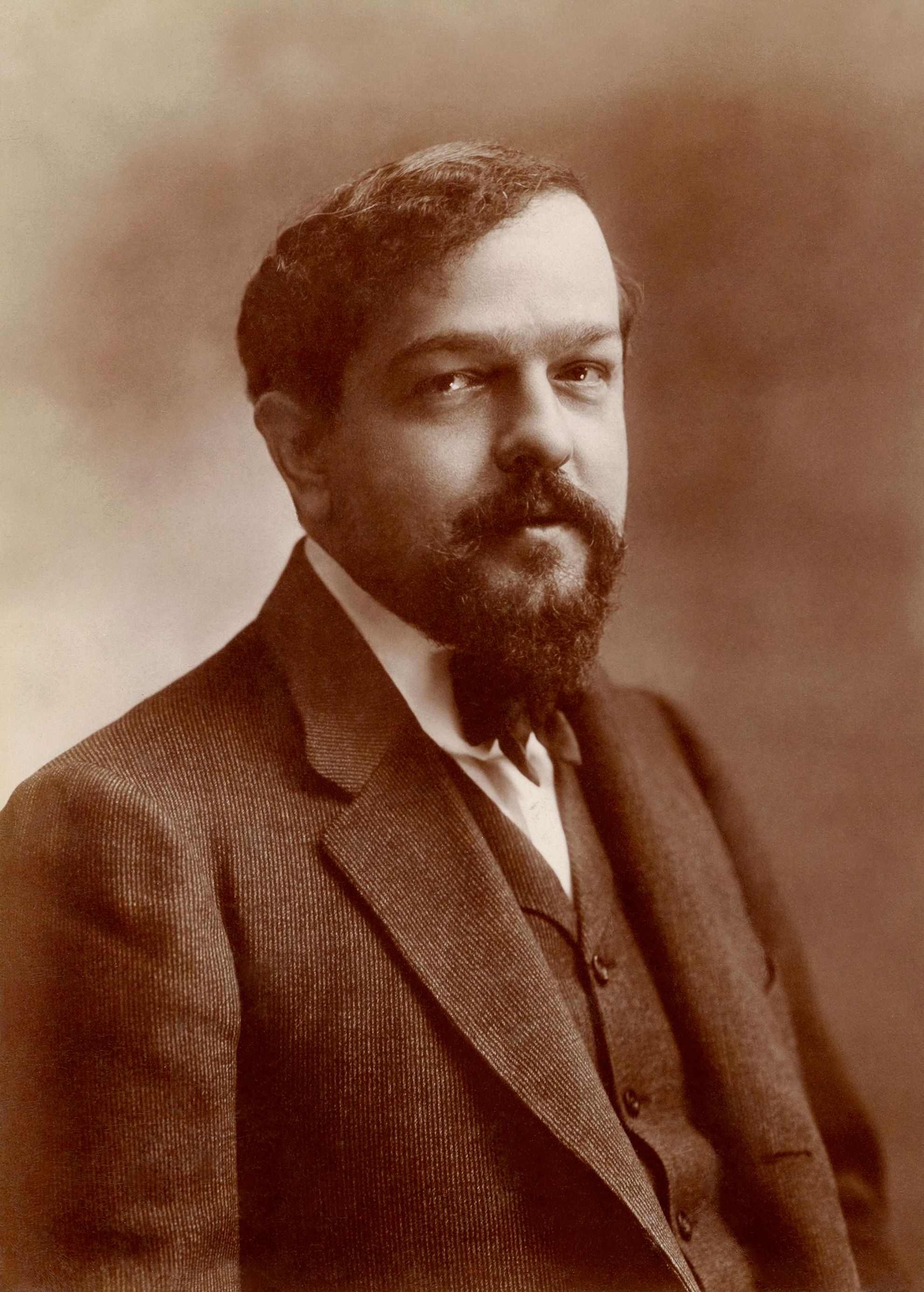
Ce qu'a vu le vent d'ouest is one of three undated preludes in Book I by Claude Debussy (pictured).

Ce qu'a vu le vent d'ouest ("What the west wind saw") is a musical composition by French composer Claude Debussy. It is the seventh piece in the composer's first book of Préludes, written between late 1909 and early 1910. The piece is 72 measures long, taking approximately four minutes to play. It is in the key of F♯ minor.

== Background and influence ==
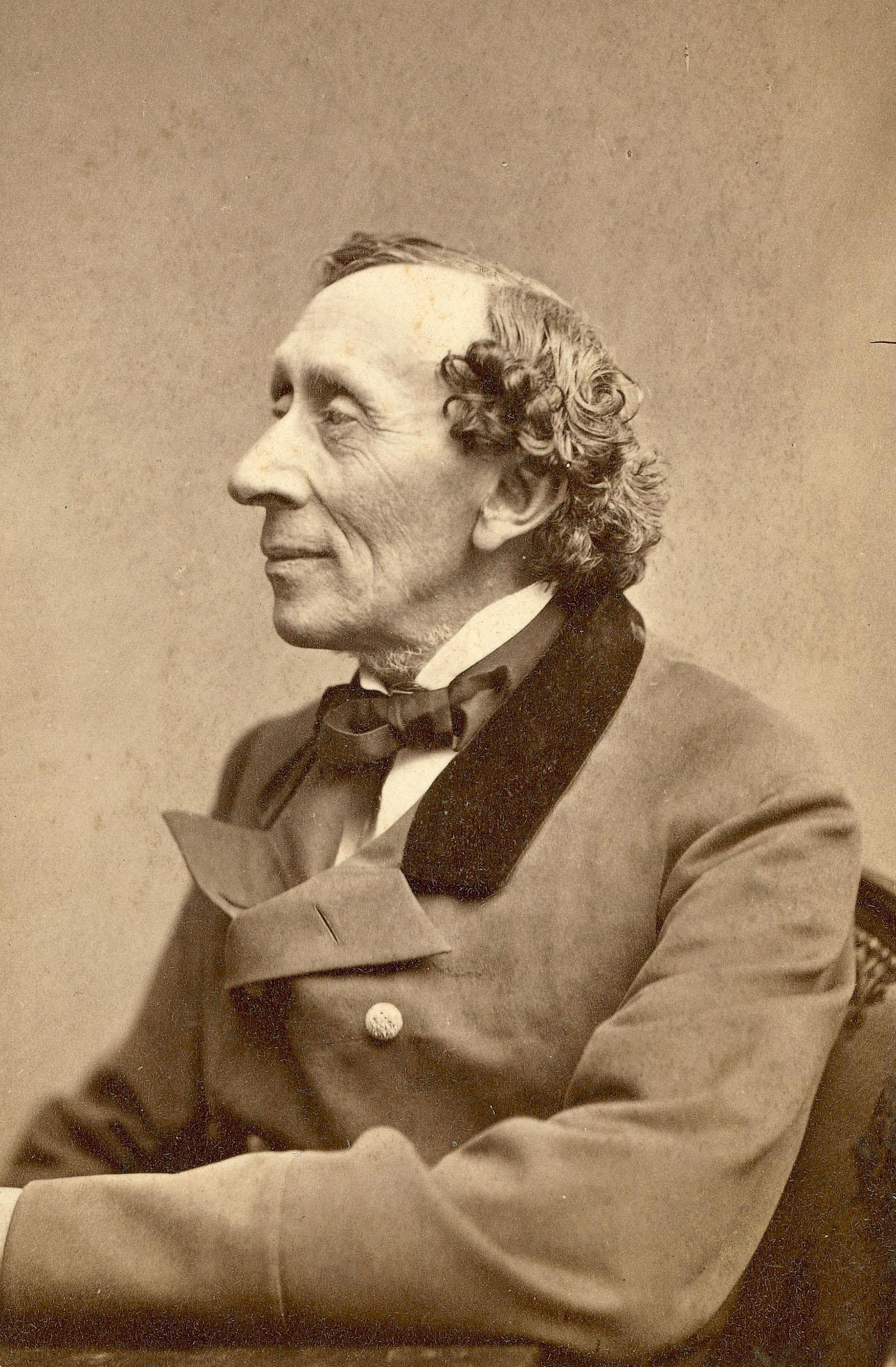
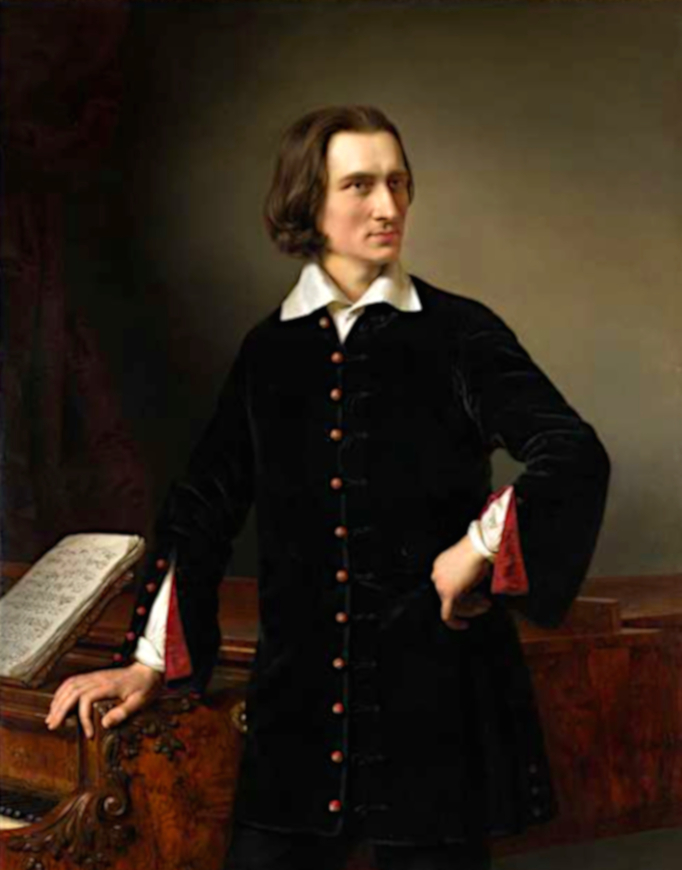
When composing this prelude, Debussy was influenced by a literary work of Hans Christian Andersen (centre) and the musical works of Franz Liszt (right).

The title of the piece was inspired by "The Garden of Paradise", a fairy tale by Hans Christian Andersen that was translated into French and published in 1907. Debussy was known to have an affinity towards Andersen's stories, and it has been theorized that the author's character Zephyr – the West Wind – would have "appealed" to the composer when he was writing the prelude. Furthermore, the technical aspects of this piece were influenced by the works of Franz Liszt. This is evident in Debussy's utilization of "sweeping arpeggios" at the beginning of the piece, which lead towards loud booming chords and extreme dissonance.

== History ==
The prelude is one of three works from Book I – along with La sérénade interrompue and La cathédrale engloutie – whose date of completion is unknown. It was first published in April 1910, along with the rest of his preludes from that book. It premiered at the Stockbridge Casino in Stockbridge, Massachusetts on July 26, 1910, with Walter Morse Rummel performing the work.

Due to the challenging nature of this prelude, it is considered a virtuosic performance piece, and the first of this kind in his book of preludes.

== Musical analysis ==
=== Placement within Preludes, Book I ===
Debussy was known for his extreme meticulousness in the placement of his preludes. Pianist and musical writer Paul Roberts asserts that this prelude, along with the prelude that precedes it and the one that follows it, forms "the central arch" of Book I's structure, since the three pieces provide the most "dramatic contrast" out of all the preludes in the first book. The sixth prelude, Des pas sur la neige (Footprints in the Snow), exudes a feeling of sadness and isolation, while the La fille aux cheveux de lin (The Girl with the Flaxen Hair)—the eighth—brings about a sense of warmth and gentleness. In stark contrast to both these preludes, Le Vent d'Ouest evokes a tumultuous nature, with Lederer describing the prelude as exhibiting "cathartic violence". By placing these three preludes in this particular order, Debussy ensured that this prelude—arguably the most technically challenging prelude of the entire collection—was situated in-between the two that are the simplest to play out of the twenty-four.
