= Rummel =

== People ==
Rummel is the surname of:

- Elizabeth Rummel (1897-1980), German-Canadian mountaineer and environmentalist
- Franz Rummel (1853–1901), German pianist
- Henrik Rummel (born 1987), American rower
- Joseph Rummel (1876–1964), American Archbishop
- Louise Rummel, New Zealand nurse educator
- Martin Rummel (born 1974), Austrian cellist
- R. J. Rummel (1932–2014), American historian and political scientist
- Sam Rummel (1906–1950), American attorney and murder victim
- Walter Morse Rummel (1887–1953), German-born French pianist

== Other ==
- Archbishop Rummel High School, Metairie, Louisiana
- Bavarian Rummel, the 1703 Bavarian campaign in Tyrol

== See also ==
- Rummel T
