= List of pieces that use the whole-tone scale =

This is a list of notable musical works which use the whole tone scale.

- Béla Bartók
  - Cantata Profana, b. 186–187
  - Concerto for Orchestra, fifth movement, b. 484
  - String Quartet No. 1, end of movement 3
  - String Quartet No. 4, first movement, b. 157–160
  - String Quartet No. 5 "The sequence of tonalities of the single sections [of the sonata form] produce the whole-tone scale". "In the first movement of the Fifth String Quartet...the tonalities of the individual sections form a complete whole-tone scale (B♭–C–D–E–F♯–G♯–B♭)."
  - Mikrokosmos, Volume V, No.136 "Whole-Tone Scales"
- Alban Berg
  - Violin Concerto
  - "Nacht" from Seven Early Songs
- Hector Berlioz
  - Francs-Juges Overture
- Ferruccio Busoni
  - An die Jugend for piano, the right hand part of the "Preludietto, Fughetta ed Esercizio" is based on the whole tone scale.
- Frédéric Chopin
  - Prelude No. 19, mm. 43–44, in the bass, "while the melody moves down chromatically"
- Alexander Dargomyzhsky
  - The Stone Guest, passage from act 3
- Peter Maxwell Davies
  - Symphony No. 3, first movement, horns, between rehearsals P and Q
Whole tone scale in Debussy's Voiles, mm. 1–4
- Claude Debussy
  - Chansons de Bilitis
  - Children's Corner
  - Images for piano, No. 1
  - Jeux
  - La mer
  - Pelléas et Mélisande, act 4 scene 2
  - Prélude à l'après-midi d'un faune, b. 32–33, 35–36
  - Voiles from Préludes, Book 1
- Edward Elgar
  - The Dream of Gerontius
- Blair Fairchild
  - A Baghdad Lover, nine songs for bass and piano, Op. 25 (1911)
- Mikhail Glinka
  - Ruslan and Lyudmila, near the end of the overture, in the finale to act 1, and in the act 4 chorus "Pogibnet! Pogibnet!"
- The Human Abstract
  - "Holographic Sight"
- Leoš Janáček
  - Sinfonietta (1926)
- Sigfrid Karg-Elert
  - "Allegro burlesco" from the Sonatina exotique for piano
- King Crimson
  - "Fracture"
  - One More Red Nightmare
- Kraftwerk
  - "Spacelab" (from The Man-Machine)
- Franz Liszt
  - Fantasy and Fugue on the chorale "Ad nos, ad salutarem undam", for organ
  - Réminiscences de Don Juan
- Gustav Mahler
  - Symphony No. 5, end of fifth movement, b. 784-787
  - Das Lied von der Erde, sixth movement, b. 454-459
- Olivier Messiaen
  - Quartet for the End of Time (movement 6, "Danse of Fury, for the seven trumpets", cello part)
- Lee Morgan
  - "Our Man Higgins"
- Wolfgang Amadeus Mozart
  - A Musical Joke
- Giacomo Puccini
  - Madama Butterfly
- Maurice Ravel
  - Jeux d'Eau, page 1
- Vladimir Rebikov
  - Une fête, No. 6
  - Les rêves
- Nikolai Rimsky-Korsakov
  - Piano Concerto, 1882, Allegro
- Arnold Schoenberg
  - "Am Wegrand", Op. 6, no. 6
  - Chamber Symphony No. 1
  - "Jesus bettelt", Op. 2, no. 2
  - Pelleas und Melisande
  - String Quartet No. 1
- Franz Schubert
  - "Sanctus" from the Mass No. 6 in E♭ major, D. 950
- Sparks
  - "In the Future" from the album Indiscreet
- Karlheinz Stockhausen
  - Montag aus Licht, act 1, scene 6, "Das große Geweine", b. 879–881
- Igor Stravinsky
  - L'Histoire du soldat
- Heitor Villa-Lobos
  - Chôros No. 2
  - String Quartet No. 3, second movement (Molto Vivo)
- Stevie Wonder
  - "You Are the Sunshine of My Life" (introduction)
- Joe Hisaishi
  - "Les Aventuriers" from Piano Stories II – The Wind of Life, 1996

== See also ==
- Impressionist music
