= Flaxen =

Flaxen generally describes things that are made of flax, or have the color of unspun dressed flax — a pale yellowish-gray. Uses include:

- Flaxen, a variant of the blonde human hair color
- Flaxen gene, a gene that causes light-colored manes and tails in chestnut-colored horses
- La fille aux cheveux de lin, translated as The Girl with the Flaxen Hair, a composition by Debussy
- Flaxen elimia, a species of freshwater snail, Elimia boykiniana
- a brand name of Venlafaxine, an antidepressant

== See also ==
- Flax
- Flax (disambiguation)
