= Brassin =

Brassin may refer to:

- Brassinosteroid
- Louis Brassin (1840–1884), Belgian pianist and composer
