= La fille aux cheveux de lin =

Composition for piano by Claude Debussy

La Fille aux Cheveux de Lin (2:26)
Debussy's "The Girl with the Flaxen Hair", Performed by Mike Ambrose.

La Fille aux Cheveux de Lin (2:49)
Performed in 2016 by Patrizia Prati on piano, live at Museum of Romanticism (Madrid)

La Fille aux Cheveux de Lin (2:15)
Performed in 2015 by the Wasei Dúo, saxophone & piano, live at Museum of Romanticism (Madrid) on November 3, 2015.

La fille aux cheveux de lin (French: [la fij o ʃəvø də lɛ̃]) is a musical composition for solo piano by French composer Claude Debussy. It is the eighth piece in the composer's first book of Préludes, written between late 1909 and early 1910. The title is in French and translates roughly to "The Girl with the Flaxen Hair". The piece is 39 measures long and takes approximately two and a half minutes to play. It is in the key of G♭ major.

The piece, named after the poem by Leconte de Lisle, is known for its musical simplicity, a divergence from Debussy's style at the time. Completed in January 1910, it was published three months later and premiered in June of that same year. The prelude is one of Debussy's most recorded pieces, both in its original version and in subsequent various arrangements.

== Background and influence ==
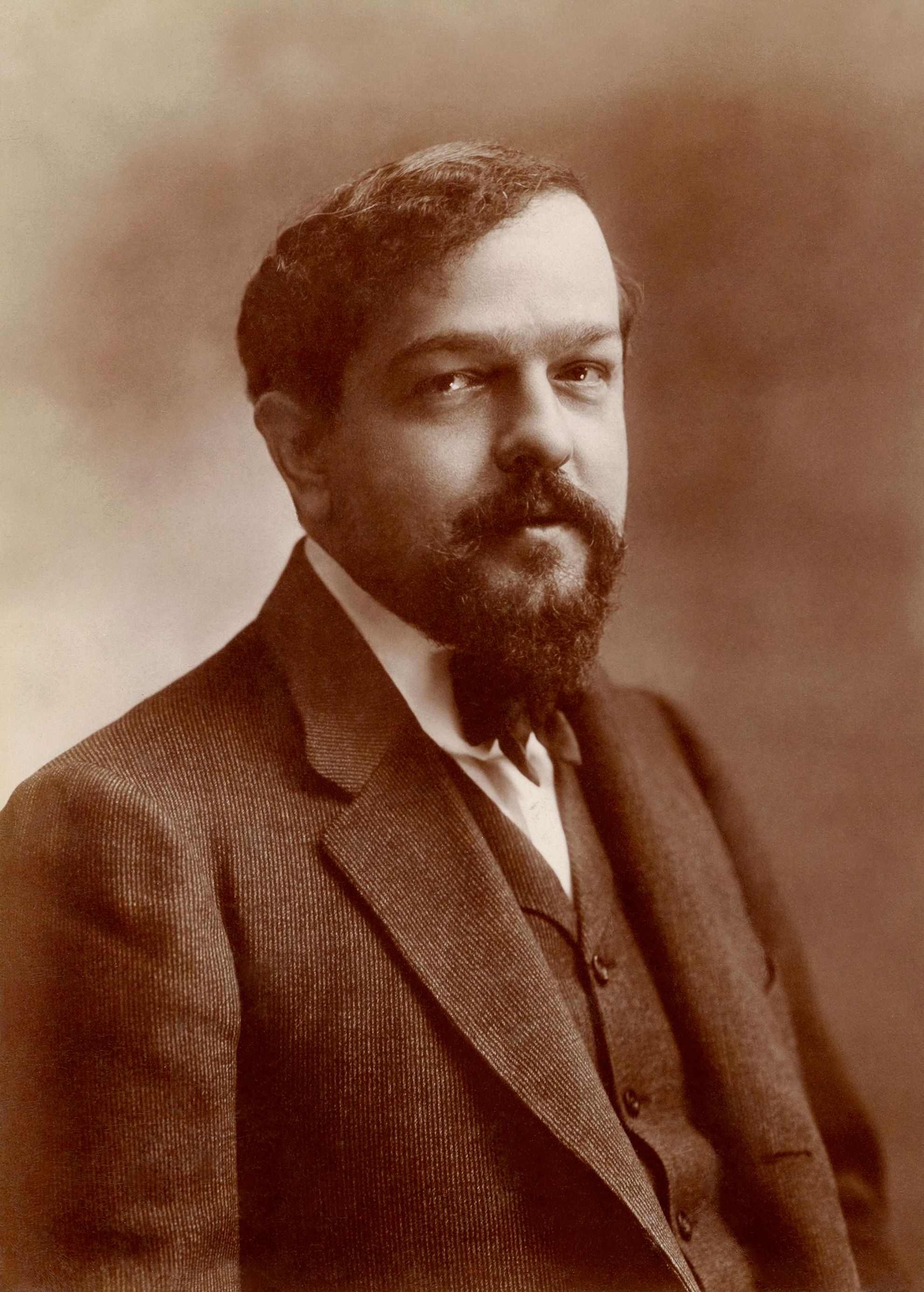
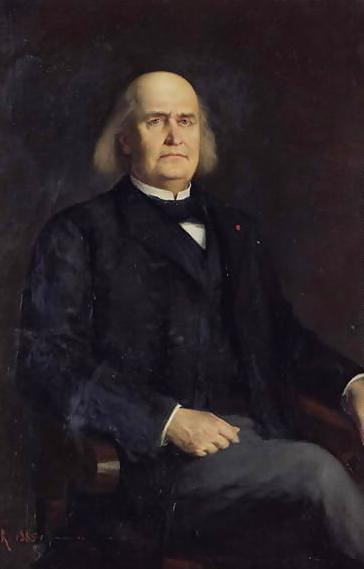
Claude Debussy (left) named this prelude after Leconte de Lisle's (right) poem by the same name.

The title La fille aux cheveux de lin was inspired by Leconte de Lisle's poem by the same name, one of his Chansons écossaises (Scottish songs) from his 1852 collection Poèmes antiques (Ancient Poems). The image of a girl with flaxen-coloured hair has been utilized in fine art as a symbol of innocence and naivety. Writers have suggested that Debussy's successful portrayal of these emotions was tied in with the musical simplicity of the prelude—specifically, the technical and harmonic elements. His choice of simplicity for this piece was highly unusual, since it deviated from his style at the time and brought back the simple harmonies that he had utilized in his earlier musical compositions, which were more traditional.

Debussy had previously utilized the title for a mélodie he wrote from 1882 to 1884. However, it does not feature any similarities to the 1910 prelude, and merely has a "distant familial relationship" with the prelude at most according to James R. Briscoe in the music journal 19th-Century Music. The song, which is one of his earlier works, was dedicated to Marie-Blanche Vasnier. She had an affair with Debussy at the time, and he dedicated most of the compositions he wrote from 1880 to 1884 to her.

=== Poem ===
Leconte de Lisle's original poem was written in French. In English, it is translated as:

On the lucerne midst flowers in bloom,
Who sings praises to morning?
It is the girl with golden hair,
The beauty with lips of cherry.

For, love, in clear summer sunlight,
Has soared with the lark and sung now.

Your mouth has such colours divine,
My dear, so tempting to kisses.
On grass in bloom, talk to me, please,
Girl with fine curls and long lashes.

For, love, in clear summer sunlight,
Has soared with the lark and sung now.

Do not say no, cruel maiden.
Do not say yes. Better to know
The long lasting gaze of your eyes
And your rosy lips, oh, my belle.

For, love, in clear summer sunlight,
Has soared with the lark and sung now.

Farewell, you deer, farewell you hares
And the red partridge. I want
To stroke the gold of your tresses
Smothering lips with my kisses.

For, love, in clear summer sunlight,
Has soared with the lark and sung now.

== History ==
The prelude was completed on 15–16 January 1910, and was first published in April of that same year, along with the rest of his preludes from Book I. Its first performance was given by Franz Liebich at the Bechstein Hall in London two months later, on 2 June. This was followed by an American premiere at the Stockbridge Casino in Stockbridge, Massachusetts on 26 July 1910, performed by Walter Morse Rummel. Subsequently, the French premiere took place the following year on 14 January at the Société Nationale de Musique in Paris, with Ricardo Viñes performing the work.

A transcription of the prelude for violin and piano was created by Arthur Hartmann—a close friend of Debussy—and released in May 1910.

La fille remains one of the most recorded musical compositions of Debussy's. Despite its performance on a recurring basis, the prelude remains popular among audiences, partly because of its "memorable tune" which is juxtaposed with a "mellow accompaniment". It has received acclaim for its expansiveness of emotion, with the Richmond Times-Dispatch's Clarke Bustard describing the piece as "perhaps the most delicately characterful" out of all his twenty-four preludes.

== Musical analysis ==
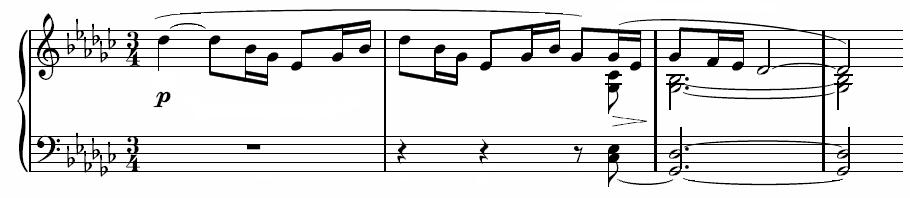
Opening theme from La fille aux cheveux de lin

=== Placement within Preludes, Book I ===
Debussy was known for his meticulousness in the arrangement of his preludes. Pianist and musical writer Paul Roberts asserts that this prelude, along with the two that immediately precede it, forms "the central arch" of Book I's structure, since the three pieces provide the most "dramatic contrast" out of all the preludes in the first book. The sixth prelude, Des pas sur la neige (Footprints in the Snow), evokes a feeling of sadness and isolation, while Ce qu'a vu le vent d'ouest (What the West Wind Saw) — the seventh — exudes a violent and tumultuous nature. In stark contrast to these two, La fille brings about a sense of gentle "lyricism" and "warmth", which is uncharacteristic of Debussy's music of this kind. By placing these three preludes in this particular order, Debussy ensured that arguably one of the most technically challenging preludes of the collection (Vent d'ouest) was situated in between the two that are the simplest to play out of the twenty-four.

=== Composition ===
The prelude's central idea takes after its title – a girl with golden hair in a pastoral setting in Scotland. Thus, it is one of many examples of Debussy's Impressionist music, since it conjures up images of a foreign place. His utilization of pentatonic scales throughout the piece achieves this, and by blending this in with harmonizing diatonic chords and modal cadences, he creates a folk-like tune. This prelude uses more plagal leading tones than any other piece composed by Debussy, and the prelude's melody alternates between conjunct and disjunct movement throughout.

The piece begins with its well-known opening theme consisting of three-note phrases, grouped together as one eighth note and two sixteenth notes. It finishes with chords that form a plagal cadence between bars 2 and 3, an element that is not featured in his previous preludes. The second part of the melody enters in bars 5–6, evoking a Scottish ballad or resembling a tune in the style of Edvard Grieg. The melody from the opening returns in bar 8 with added harmony in the left hand. At bar 19, the melody begins its ascent to the climax of the piece, gradually building up through the use of crescendo to propel it to peak at the end of bar 21. Near the end of bar 22, the melody diminuendos to the subsequent measure, where the theme of the climax is repeated an octave lower. A pianissimo drone-like part that moves in parallel motion—featuring consecutive fifths in some places—comes in at bars 24 to 27. In the next measure, the prelude's coda sees the return of the opening theme one last time—albeit at an octave higher—followed by the droning motif. Finally, the melody ascends in parallel movement and makes use of a final plagal leading cadence to get to the home key chord in root position. This cadence neither "melodically anticipates the arrival pitch" nor does it include the tonic in the left hand. Thus, it has been described as "the ideal harmonization of the plagal leading tone." The melody ends with two arpeggiated octave chords (D♭ in the left hand followed by G♭ in the right), bringing the prelude to a close.

=== Philosophical interpretations ===
In The Aesthetics of Music (1999), philosopher Roger Scruton discusses La Fille aux Cheveux de Lin as an example of what he calls "reference without predication." He argues that the prelude evokes qualities such as youth and happiness through harmonic and melodic suggestion rather than through narrative representation. Scruton also relates this effect to Claude Debussy's practice of placing the titles at the end of his preludes, maintaining that the title retrospectively frames the listener's perception of the music's atmosphere. He later incorporated an allusion to the work in his own piano composition Boreas Blows Not, describing the quotation as a form of "subliminal narrative."
