= Flax (disambiguation) =

Flax (Linum usitatissimum) is a plant cultivated for food and fiber in cooler regions of the world.

Flax may also refer to:

- Flax (color), a pale yellowish-gray color
- Flax (moth), a genus of moths
- Holly Flax, a fictional character from the American TV series The Office
- Ken Flax (born 1963), American Olympic hammer thrower
- Flax Art Supply Stores, a group of art supply stores in the United States
- Flax, a Python library that uses Google JAX.

== Plants ==
- Linum, flaxes, a genus of approximately 200 species of flowering plants, including Linum usitatissimum
- Cannabis sativa, an annual herbaceous flowering plant better known as hemp
- Santolina rosmarinifolia, holy flax, a species of flowering plant in the daisy family Asteraceae
- Phormium, New Zealand flax or flax lily
  - Phormium tenax, flax or New Zealand flax
  - Phormium colensoi, mountain flax or lesser New Zealand flax

== See also ==
- Flaxen (disambiguation)
