= La cathédrale engloutie =

Piano composition by Claude Debussy

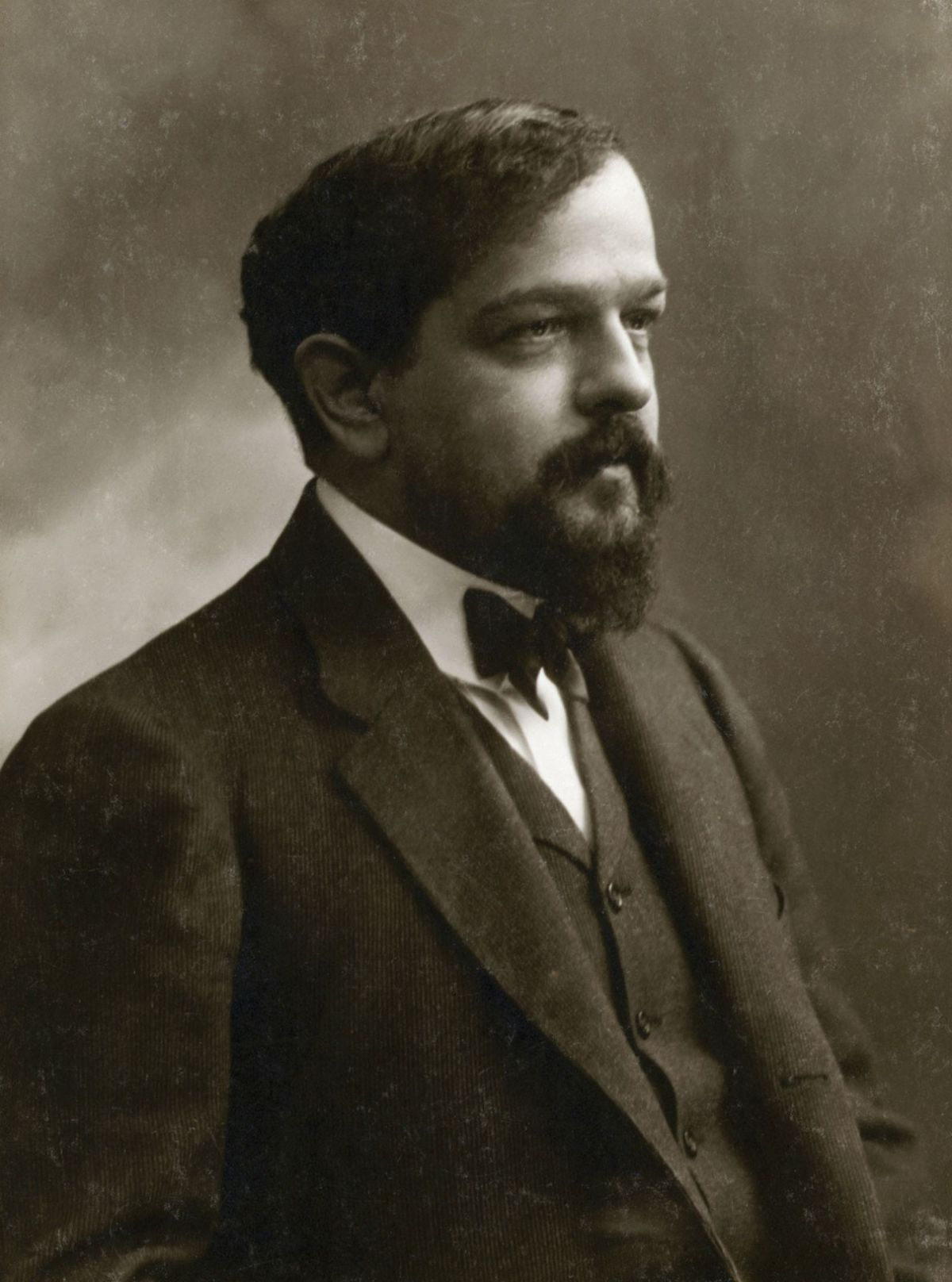
Claude Debussy ca. 1908

"La cathédrale engloutie" (The Sunken Cathedral) is a musical composition by the French composer Claude Debussy for solo piano, published in 1910. It is the tenth piece in Debussy's first book of préludes. It is characteristic of Debussy in its form, harmony, and content.

== Musical impressionism ==
La cathedrale engloutie (5:25)
Performed by pianist Ivan Ilic in April 2006, Paris

This prelude is an example of Debussy's musical impressionism in that it is a musical depiction of, or allusion to, an image or idea. Debussy quite often named his pieces in accordance with the image that he intended to evoke, such as in the case of La Mer, "Des pas sur la neige", or "Jardins sous la pluie". In the case of the two volumes of preludes, he places the title of the piece at the end of the piece, either to allow the pianist to respond intuitively and individually to the music before finding out what Debussy intended the music to sound like, or to apply more ambiguity to the music's allusion. Because this piece is based on a legend, it can be considered program music.

== Legend of Ys ==
This piece is based on an ancient Breton myth in which a cathedral, submerged underwater off the coast of the Island of Ys, rises up from the sea on clear mornings when the water is transparent. Sounds can be heard of priests chanting, bells chiming, and the organ playing, from across the sea. Accordingly, Debussy uses certain harmonies to allude to the plot of the legend, in the style of musical symbolism.

To begin the piece, Debussy uses parallel fifths. The first chord of the piece is made up of sonorous Gs and Ds (open fifths). The use of stark, open fifths here allude to the idea of church bells that sound from the distance, across the ocean. The opening measures, marked pianissimo, introduce us to the first series of rising parallel fifth chords, outlining a G major pentatonic scale. These chords bring to mind two things: 1) the Eastern pentatonic scale, which Debussy heard during a performance of Javanese gamelan music at the 1889 Universal Exhibition in Paris, and 2) medieval chant music, similar to the organa in parallel fifths from the Musica enchiriadis, a 9th-century treatise on music. The shape of the ascending phrase is perhaps a representation of the cathedral's slow emergence from the water.

After the beginning section, Debussy gently brings the cathedral out of the water by modulating to B major, shaping the melody in a wave-like fashion, and including important narrative instructions in measure 16: Peu à peu sortant de la brume (Emerging from the fog little by little). This shows Debussy at his closest manifestation of musical impressionism. Then, after a section marked Augmentez progressivement (Slowly growing), the cathedral has emerged and the grand organ is heard at a dynamic level of fortissimo (measures 28–41). This is the loudest and most profound part of the piece, and is described in the score as Sonore sans dureté (Sonorous but without harshness). Following the grand entrance and exit of the organ, the cathedral sinks back down into the ocean (measures 62–66) and the organ is heard once more, but from underwater. To attain these effects that reflect images of the castle, most performers use specific techniques with regards to pedaling and articulation to affect tone color. For example, some performers use their full body weight to depress keys to create a rich sound. Also performers create a ringing bell sound by instantly releasing pedaled notes. Finally, the cathedral is gone from sight, and only the bells are heard, at a distant pianissimo.

== Musical analysis ==
=== Form ===
The "organ chords" in "La cathédrale engloutie"

The overall form of this piece can be loosely attributed to a ternary ABA form, which splits nicely into sections at the written key change so that A encompasses the beginning to bar 46, B encompasses bars 47–71, and A^{I} encompasses bar 72 to the end. Each larger section can be further divided into smaller sections and themes, which are arranged to give the piece a roughly symmetrical structure.

The A section can itself be divided into three smaller sections: a_{1} (b. 1–15), a_{2} (b. 16–21), and a_{3} (b. 22–46). The introduction of the piece (a_{1}) features the G major pentatonic collection in ascending block chords evocative of organum chant with many parallel fifths. This motif repeats itself twice, but each time the bass moves down a single step, so that the first repeat of the motif takes place over an F in the bass and the second repeat over an E. This changes the collectional center of the opening to the relative E minor pentatonic. The top note of this motif, an E, is held in octaves and repeated, evoking the sound of church bells. This leads to a brief section within a_{1} where a new theme is presented in C♯ minor, weaving around the E bell tones. At b. 14, the initial pentatonic theme returns, but this time over a C in the bass. This is the first hint of the true tonic of the A section and the piece overall. The a_{2} section begins at b. 16 with a shift in key to B major and a new rhythmic drive introduced by 8th note triplets in the left hand. This stands in stark contrast to the slow, open quarter and half note lines of the a_{1} section, though the right hands still features similar ascending quarter note chords. In b. 19, a slightly modified version of this material is presented in E♭ major. The melodic material in both the B major and E♭ major sections utilize the respective pentatonic modes of those keys. This section builds to the arrival at the a_{3} section. The beginning part of a_{3} (b. 22–27) builds on a G dominant 7th chord and returns to utilizing more open-sounding half note and quarter note lines. This builds up to the climax of the piece at b. 28, where the main thematic material of the A section, hinted at throughout the preceding material, is presented in C major fortissimo. The thick block chords played with both hands evoke the sound of an organ. While the majority of this theme is presented in the C major diatonic mode, the addition of a B♭ in b. 33–37 briefly changes the mode to C mixolydian before returning to ionian (major). The ending bars of a_{3}, 42–46, serve as a transition into the B section of the piece.

The B section features a modulation to C♯ minor and presents the corresponding melodic material from the A/a_{1} section. This material is expanded and builds up to a climax within the B section at bar 61. As the music recedes down from this climax, one of the most interesting sonorities of the piece is presented in b. 63 in the form of dominant 7th chords with chordal planing. The roots of these planing chords follow the key signature but the quality of each chord remains dominant. This gives way to a 4-bar transition (b. 68–71) to the final A^{I} section.

The A^{I} section is something of a mirror image of the original A section. The C major theme that was originally presented in the final (a_{3}) section of A returns at the beginning of A^{I}, this time pianissimo, not scored quite as thickly, and in a lower register over an oscillating 8th note figure in the bass. This gives way to the final small section of the piece (b. 84–89), which is a mirror to the introduction of the piece (a_{1}). The rising pentatonic figuration seen at the beginning appears here, this time in the tonic C major. The piece ends on a C major chord with an added scale degree 2.

The nearly symmetrical ABA form helps illustrate the legend that Debussy is alluding to in the work, and his markings help point toward both the form and the legend. For example, the first section is described as being “dans une brume doucement sonore,” or “in a sweetly sonorous fog.” Then, at bar 16, the markings say “peu à peu sortant de la brume,” or “little by little emerging from the fog.” This change in imagery (as well as the accompanying change in tonality) could represent the cathedral emerging from under the water. At bar 72, the marking says “comme un écho de la phrase entendue précedemment,” or “like an echo of the previously heard phrase,” which could be like the cathedral which had emerged gradually getting farther away and perhaps returning into the water.

=== Debussy's depiction ===
In this piece, Debussy composes the music using motivic development, rather than thematic development. After all, “Debussy mistrusted [thematic] development as a method of composition.” Fundamentally, the entire piece is made up of two basic motifs, with the first motif existing in three different variations, making 4 fragments in total (not counting the inversions and transpositions of each). The motifs are: 1) D–E–B ascending; 1a) D–E–A ascending; 1b) D–E–G ascending; 2) E–C♯ descending. Debussy masterfully saturates the entire structure of the piece with these motifs in large- and small-scale ways. For example, motif 1 appears in the bottom of the right-hand chords on the 2nd, 3rd, and 4th quarter notes of measure 14 (D-E-B), and again in the next three quarter note beats (D–E–B). Not by coincidence, motif 1b is heard in the 4th, 5th, and 6th quarter note beats of measure 14 (B–D–E). Motif 1 is heard on a broader scale in the bass notes (dotted whole notes) in measures 1–16, hitting the notes of the motif in inversion and transposition on the down-beats of measures 1, 15, and 16 (G–C–B). Also within measures 1 through 15 are two occurrences of motif 2 (G in measure 1, E in measure 5; E in measure 5, C in measure 15.) Motif 1 is also heard in a soprano voice from measure 1–15: The high D in measures 1, 3, and 5; the soprano E octave that occurs 12 times from measures 6–13; the high B in measures 14 and 15. Throughout all of this motivic repetition, transposition, and inversion, the themes (longer phrases made up of the smaller motifs) stay very much static, with only occasional elongation or shortening throughout the piece: The rising pentatonic theme in measure 1 (theme 1) repeats in measure 3, 5, 14, 15, 16, 17, 84, 85, and with a slight variations in measures 28–40 and 72–83. A second theme (theme 2), appearing for the first time in measures 7–13, repeats in measures 47–51.

=== Context ===
This prelude is typical of Debussy's compositional characteristics. It is a complete exploration of chordal sound that encompasses the entire range of the piano, and that includes one of Debussy's signature chords (a major tonic triad with added second and sixth scale degrees). Third, it shows Debussy's use of parallel harmony (the section beginning in measure 28, especially), which is defined as a coloration of the melodic line. This is quite different from simple melodic doubling, like the thirds in "Voiles", or the fifths in La Mer, which are not usually heard alone without a significant accompanimental figure. Parallel harmony forces the chords to be understood less with functional roots, and more as coloristic expansions of the melodic line. Overall, this prelude, as a representative of the 24 preludes, shows Debussy's radical compositional process when viewed in light of the previous 200 years of classical and romantic music.

=== Parallelism ===
Debussy's "La cathédrale engloutie" contains instances of one of the most significant techniques found in the music of the Impressionist period called parallelism. There are two methods of parallelism in music; exact and inexact. Inexact parallelism allows the quality of the harmonic intervals to vary throughout the line, even if the interval sizes are identical, while in exact parallelism the sizes and qualities remain the same as the line progresses. Inexact parallelism can give a sense of tonality, while exact parallelism can dispel the sense of tonality as pitch content cannot be analyzed diatonically in a single key.

Debussy uses parallelism (also known as harmonic planing) in his prelude to dilute the sense of direction motion found in prior traditional progressions. Through application, tonal ambiguity is created that is often seen in Impressionist music. It may be noted that it took some time for Impressionist music to be appreciated, but the critics and the listening public eventually warmed to this experiment in harmonic freedom.

== Arrangements ==
Various arrangements and transcriptions of the piece exist. A transcription for solo organ was made by Léon Roques and Jean-Baptiste Robin in 2011 (recording Brilliant Classics 94233). It was arranged for orchestra in 1926 by Leopold Stokowski as "The Engulfed Cathedral" and released in a Philadelphia Orchestra recording in 1930. It appears in a cover version on the album Grand Guignol by John Zorn's band Naked City. Sections of Debussy's piece are also used in the introduction and final of Renaissance's song At the Harbour, from their 1973 album Ashes Are Burning. Isao Tomita arranged the piece for electronic synthesizer as part of his Snowflakes Are Dancing recording of 1973–1974. John Carpenter used it as sound track in his 1981 science fiction movie Escape from New York. The conductor Sir Henry Wood gave the first performance of his own orchestration of the work during the 1919 Proms season. The composer Henri Büsser made a transcription for orchestra of this piece in 1921, while composer Colin Matthews arranged it for the Hallé Orchestra in 2007.
