= Georgs Pelēcis =

Latvian composer and musicologist

Georgs Pelēcis (also Georges Pélétsis; born 18 June 1947) is a Latvian composer and musicologist. He is currently a professor at the Latvian Academy of Music.

== Academic and compositional career ==
Pelēcis was born in Riga. He studied under Aram Khachaturian at the Moscow Conservatory, and post-graduate music theory studies with Vladimir Protopopov (1908-2004). At the Latvian State Conservatory he became a lecturer, then professor of counterpoint and fugue. He has worked in a creative capacity at Oxford University and Cambridge University.

His style has been described as post-avant-garde, or as "new consonant music", with an "amazingly clear positive spirit". The Concertina Bianca for piano and strings, for instance, is described as "in the key of C major" and restricted to the white keys only, with no accidentals. This approach has its critics. Gramophone called the piece as "so mild in its manner that it seems to be aspiring to the status of a backing track to an entry for the Eurovision Song Contest".

His 45 minute orchestral score for Roald Dahl's Jack and the Beanstalk was premiered at the Royal Albert Hall in December 1996 with Simon Callow, Danny DeVito and Joanna Lumley as co-narrators. More recently, recordings and live performances by (among others) pianists Tamara-Anna Cislowska, Alexei Lubimov and Polina Osetinskaya, and by violinist Gidon Kremer (his classmate at the Moscow Conservatory), have helped establish his popularity.

=== Selected works ===
- All in the Past/Remembering Oskar Strock, tango for violin and strings (1999)
- Buena-Riga: Astor Piazzolla, Oskar Strock and Me, tango (2001)
- Children’s Concerto for piano and orchestra (1985)
- Concertino Bianco for piano and chamber orchestra (1984)
- Concerto for Balalaika, Saxophone and Orchestra (1970)
- Concerto for Wind Orchestra (1971)
- En Souvenir d’Orfée, concerto for oboe and chamber orchestra (2006)
- Dedication to My Teacher, concerto for two pianos and chamber orchestra (2003)
- Endorphin Music, concerto for orchestra (2011)
- Field of Dandelions for cello, piano and vibraphone
- Flowering Jasmine, concerto for violin, vibraphone, and strings (2007)
- Jack and the Beanstalk, for symphony orchestra and narrators
- The Last Song
- Meeting with a Friend for violin and strings (2001)
- Nevertheless, concerto for violin, piano, and strings (1994)
- Pages of a Biography, concerto for violin and chamber orchestra (2007)
- Quatrième Suite for piano
- Revelation, concerto for counter-tenor, piano, and trumpet (2003
- Seasons, cycle of six piano pieces (1977-2021)
- Thirteenth London Symphony for orchestra (after Haydn's 12 London symphonies) (2000)
- Trumpet Concerto (1982)

== Musicology ==
Pelēcis' musicological work focuses on musical form in work from the Middle Ages, Renaissance, and Baroque eras. He has written theses focusing on the work of Giovanni Pierluigi da Palestrina and Johannes Ockeghem.

Pelēcis teaches the history of theory and counterpoint at the Latvian Academy of Music, and was the first president of the Riga Center for Early Music.
