= Wassily Sapellnikoff =

Russian pianist (1867–1941)

- Born: Vasily Lvovich Sapelnikov; 2 November 1867; Odessa
- Died: 17 March 1941 (aged 73)
- Genre: Classical music
- Occupation: Pianist
- Instrument: Piano
- Labels: Vocalion Records, Decca Records

Wassily Sapellnikoff (Russian: Василий Львович Сапельников; tr. Vasily Lvovich Sapelnikov) (2 November [O.S. 21 October] 1867 – 17 March 1941), was a Ukrainian-born Russian pianist.

== Biography ==
Sapellnikoff was born in Odessa. He studied at the Odessa Conservatory under Louis Brassin and Sophie Menter, and became professor of piano at Moscow Conservatory in 1897. He eventually moved to Leipzig and finally settled in Munich.

He toured with Pyotr Ilyich Tchaikovsky in Germany, France and England. At his debut in Hamburg in 1888, he played Tchaikovsky's Piano Concerto No. 1 in B♭ minor with the composer conducting. This concert was a great success and a catalyst for his budding career as a concert pianist in Western Europe. He was the first to play this concerto in England. He was the dedicatee of a piano piece by Tchaikovsky.

Tchaikovsky considered Sapelnikov a great talent and helped him launch his performing career, particularly in Europe. He writes in his letters to his brother Modest about the performing tour in the spring 1889, in which Sapelnikov participated as the soloist:

For now I am taking Sapelnikov with me. Here I have introduced him to many people from the musical world, and wherever he plays, he creates sensation. He is a huge talent, I am becoming more and more convinced of this every day. It is difficult to imagine a more sympathetic, kind boy.

Because they spent about three weeks together on a tour in 1889 in Paris, it is sometimes asserted that he and Tchaikovsky were lovers. However, there is not evidence whatsoever to suggest anything of the kind -- a conclusion that anyone who took the trouble to study Tchaikovsky's correspondence would arrive at. Despite this, Alexander Poznansky in Tchaikovsky: The Quest for the Inner Man, makes unfounded allegations such as: "As in the case of Brandukov, it seems likely that an erotic element was present in Tchaikovsky's friendship with Sapelnikov and that he recognised it as such. Both men were quite young and good-looking. Almost certainly, however, their relations remained chaste."

Sapellnikoff first appeared in England in 1889 playing the Tchaikovsky concerto at a Royal Philharmonic Society concert, under the composer's baton. He became a favourite at Philharmonic concerts, and created a furore in 1892 by his performance of Franz Liszt's E♭ Concerto, accepting a second engagement for the same season. In 1902 he delivered the first performance in England of Sergei Rachmaninoff's 2nd Piano Concerto. In December 1912 he gave Frédéric Chopin's E minor Concerto, under Percy Pitt: in January 1914 the Rachmaninoff again, under Willem Mengelberg: in November 1914 the Liszt A major Concerto, under Thomas Beecham, a performance repeated in January 1915; and the Second Suite by Rachmaninoff (for two pianofortes) with Simeon Rumschisky in December 1915. He performed the Rachmaninoff concerto again for the RPO with Landon Ronald in January 1923.

In England he amazed George Bernard Shaw with his playing of the octave left-hand passages in Chopin's Polonaise in A♭ Heroic. Shaw referred to his left-hand playing as "a marvel even among right hands for delicacy of touch and independence and swiftness of action".

Between 1897 and 1899 he was a professor at the Moscow Conservatory, where his students included Nikolai Medtner. On 1 December 1905 Sapellnikoff recorded 12 pieces for the reproducing piano Welte-Mignon, six from his own works. He also made various gramophone records for the Vocalion label, and recorded the 2nd Piano Concerto of Rachmaninoff for Decca Records in 1929 under Basil Cameron, though this recording was never issued and is thought now to be lost.

He died in San Remo, Italy.

== Sources ==
- Eric Blom, ed., Grove Dictionary of Music and Musicians, 5th edition, reprinted 1966
- "Vassily Sapellnikoff". arbiterrecords. \. Archived from the original on February 5, 2007.
