= Dancers of Delphi =

Greek sculpture

- Κίονας με τις χορεύτριες
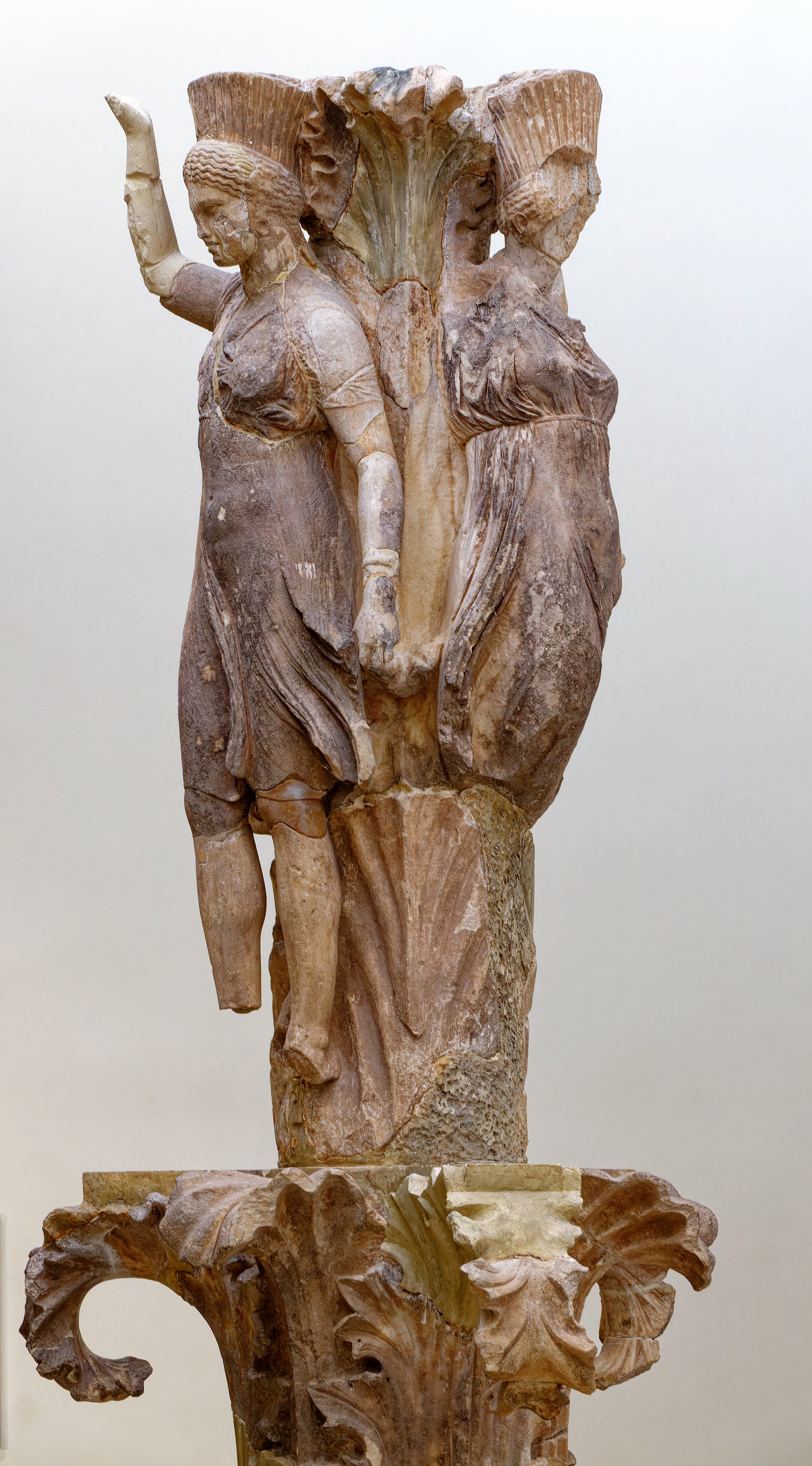
- Year: 4th century BC; Discovered: 1894
- Location: Archaeological Museum of Delphi; Delphi, Greece

The Dancers of Delphi, also known as the Acanthus Column, are three figures in high relief on top of an acanthus column found near the sanctuary of Pythian Apollo at Delphi. They are on display in the Delphi Archaeological Museum and were the inspiration for the first of Claude Debussy's Préludes.

== Description ==
The fragments were discovered between May and July 1894 on the terraces to the east and northeast of the Temple of Apollo. The excavators rapidly reconstituted a column of around 13 metres, made up of five drums and a capital decorated with acanthus leaves and surmounted by an extension of the stem with three female figures standing 1.95 metres high, wearing chitoniskoi (short tunics) and carrying kalathoi. Their bare feet are suspended in the air and their arms are raised, making them look like dancers, which is how the column gets its name.

The fastenings at the top of the capital and the concave shape of the upper surface of the column drum at the level of the dancers' heads suggests that the whole ensemble supported a colossal tripod (probably made of bronze) with its feet standing on top of the column and framing the heads of each of the dancers. It has recently been supported with good evidence that the omphalos, on display also in the museum, belonged to this complex, crowning the tripod.

== Dating ==
=== Original dating: before 373 BC ===
The fragments were discovered in the same location as the remains of the frontage of the archaic temple of Apollo and it was therefore assumed that they belonged to the same period – that is to say, before the earthquake of 373 BC. This high dating does not seem to fit the style of the statues which has more in common with the period 335–325 BC.

=== Low dating: c. 340–330 BC ===
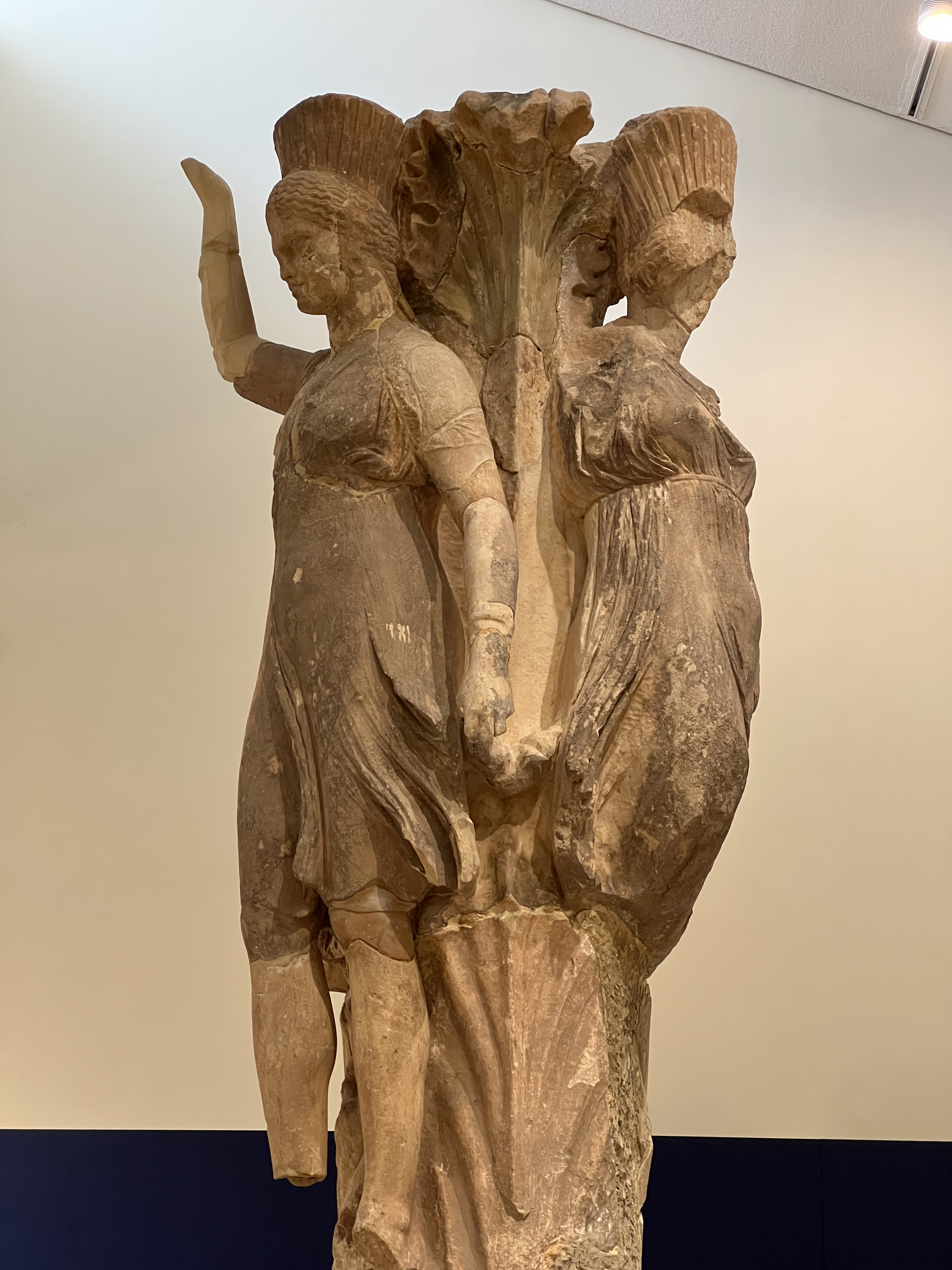
Two of the dancers.

In 1963, the publication of more precise details of the different locations in which the fragments were discovered showed that they did not belong with the remains of the archaic temple. However, other elements of the structure to which the fragments originally belonged were identified at the same location:

- an inscribed limestone base
- a poros (travertine) foundation
- two inscribed limestone blocks, one white and the other grey.

The base bore the inscription ΠΑΝ, sign of the merchant Pankrates of Argos, whose involvement in the business of the naopes (commissioners) of Delphi is attested in the period 346-345 BC. Furthermore, the base was found next to the Monument of Daochos, an ex-voto which is precisely dated between 336/335 BC and 333/332 BC, and the contemporaneous temenos of Neoptolemos. The two inscribed limestone blocks have been interpreted as the first and third layers of a three level pedestal (the location of the second layer remains unknown) which would have rested on the poros foundation. The white block has traces of a dedication stating that the Athenian people were the dedicators of the monument; the shapes of the letters and other factors suggest a late Classical or even an early Hellenistic date.

=== Vatin's theory: 375 BC ===
In 1983, the epigraphist Claude Vatin detected an inscription on the grey limestone block, mentioning the name of the eponymous archon Hippodamas and the Delphic archon Leochares, which would place the dedication in 375 BC, the year of general Timotheus' naval victory over Sparta at Alyzeia. The Athenians would then have consecrated the Dancers after that victory and as a result of damage over time (perhaps as a result of the 373 BC earthquake) they would have re-erected the monument some fifty years later after the column and its foundation had been repaired. Finally, Vatin detected the signature of the sculptor Praxiteles on the grey block, which requires a higher date than hitherto accepted in order to fit the generally accepted chronology of Praxiteles' career.

In the archonship of Leochares at Delphi and of Hippodamas at Athens, the Athenians and their allies, with the booty taken from the Lacedaemonians, consecrated this tripod and young girls to Pythian Apollo.
Work of Praxiteles.

The art historian Antonio Corso followed these observations,

=== Recent theories: ca 330 B.C. ===
No other specialist has been able to detect an inscription at the place indicated by Vatin. Furthermore, the northern and eastern sides of the base, pedestal, and column have only been roughly finished, indicating that it was already impossible to view them from these angles because the firmly dated monument of Daochos and the temenos of Neoptolemos were already present at the time of the column's construction. Ridgeway considers the style of the acanthus leaves to place the column around the date of the Philippeion at Olympia and the Choragic Monument of Lysicrates at Athens, i.e. shortly before 334 BC. The generally accepted view today is that which places the construction of the monument at about 330 BC.

== Interpretation ==
Assuming that the dedicators were the Athenian people, it has been proposed that the dancers are the three daughters of Cecrops I (the legendary first king of Attica, an autochthonous half-serpent) and of Aglauros. In Euripides' Ion, the chorus describes them among a procession of dancers on the north flank of the Acropolis, not far from Pythion, the point from which Athenian embassies to Delphi departed. In that case, the dancers could here represent the fertile land, with the acanthus symbolising their role in the creation of vegetation.

== Cultural depiction ==
Claude Debussy entitled the first of his Préludes for the piano, published in 1910 by Durand, the Danseuses de Delphes. He had not seen the sculpted group itself, but only a reproduction. It is a light piece of the sarabande type and the three parts of the piece seem to evoke the circular column and its three maidens.

== Bibliography ==
- John Boardman, Greek Sculpture: The Late Classical Period and Sculpture in Colonies and Overseas, Thames and Hudson, 1995 (ISBN 978-0-50020-285-2) p. 27 et pl. 15.
- Francis Croissant & Jean Marcadé, « La colonne des Danseuses », Guide de Delphes. Le musée, École française d'Athènes, coll. « Sites et monuments », IV, 1991 (ISBN 2-86958-038-X), p. 84-90.
- Marion Muller-Dufeu, La Sculpture grecque. Sources littéraires et épigraphiques, Paris, éditions de l'École nationale supérieure des Beaux-Arts, coll. « Beaux-Arts histoire », 2002 (ISBN 2-84056-087-9) no.1497, p. 517..
- Alain Pasquier, « Praxitèle aujourd'hui ? La question des originaux », Praxitèle, catalogue de l'exposition au musée du Louvre, 23 mars-18 juin 2007, éditions du Louvre & Somogy, 2007 (ISBN 978-2-35031-111-1), p. 85-86.
- Brunilde Sismondo Ridgway, Hellenistic Sculpture, vol. I : The Styles of ca. 331-200 B.C., Madison, University of Wisconsin Press, 2001 (ISBN 0-299-11824-X), p. 22-26.
- Rosina Kolōnia, The Archaeological Museum of Delphi, Athens, 2006, and electronic reproduction by Latsis Foundation
- Thibault, G., Martinez, J.L. (2008). «La reconstitution de la colonne des danseuses a Delphes». Actes du colloque "Virtual Retrospect 2007". Bordeaux: Edition Ausonius, pp. 231–238.
