= Des pas sur la neige =

1909 musical composition by Claude Debussy

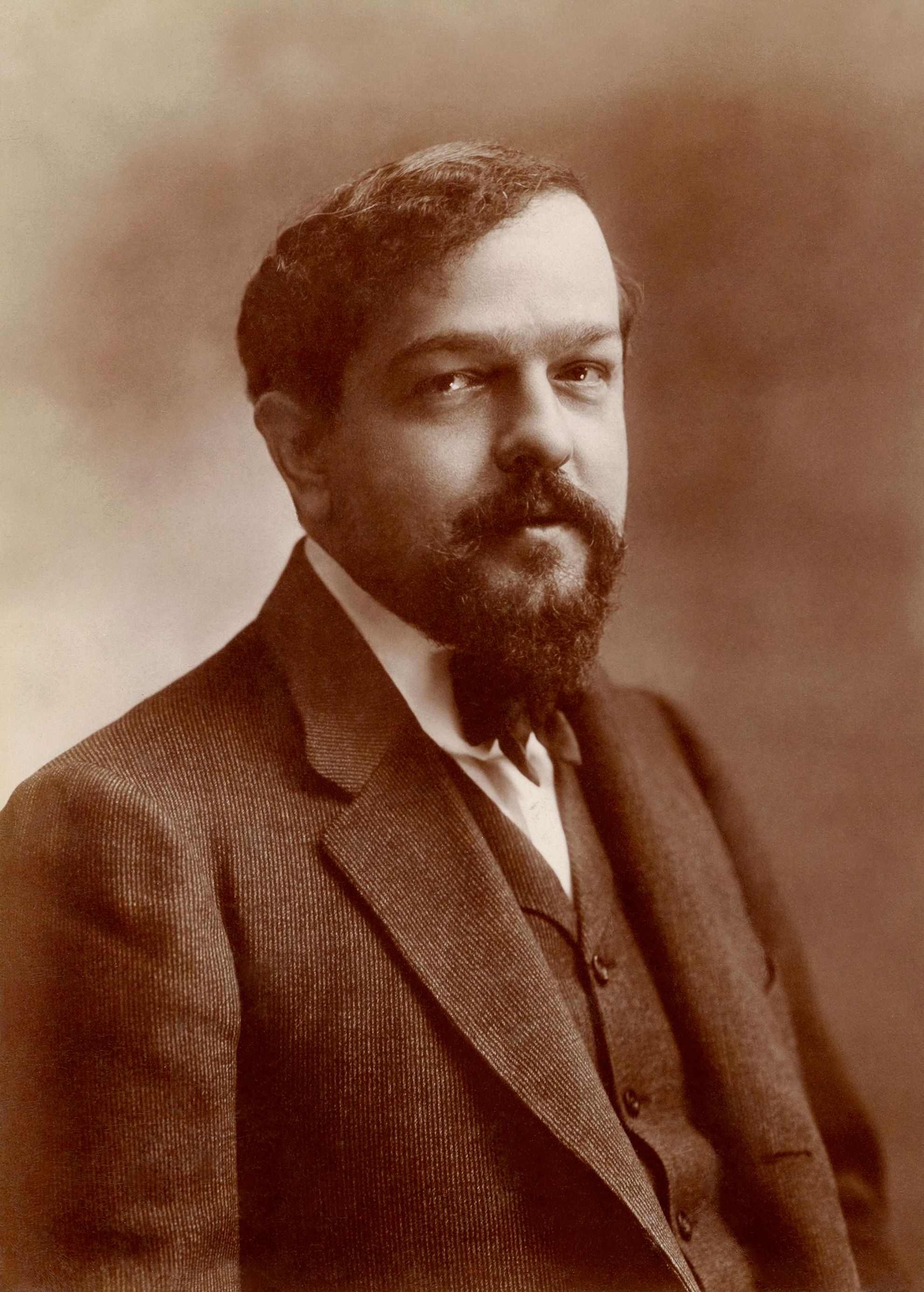
Claude Debussy performed the premiere of Des pas sur la neige himself in 1910.

Des pas sur la neige is a musical composition by French composer Claude Debussy. It is the sixth piece in the composer's first book of Préludes, written between late 1909 and early 1910. The title is in French and translates to "Footprints in the Snow" The piece is 36 measures long and takes approximately three and a half to four and a half minutes to play. It is in the key of D minor. The prelude was, along with Danseuses de Delphes, one of the preludes Debussy believed should be played "entre quatre-z-yeux" (literally "between four eyes") meaning intimately, as if privately.

== Background and influence ==
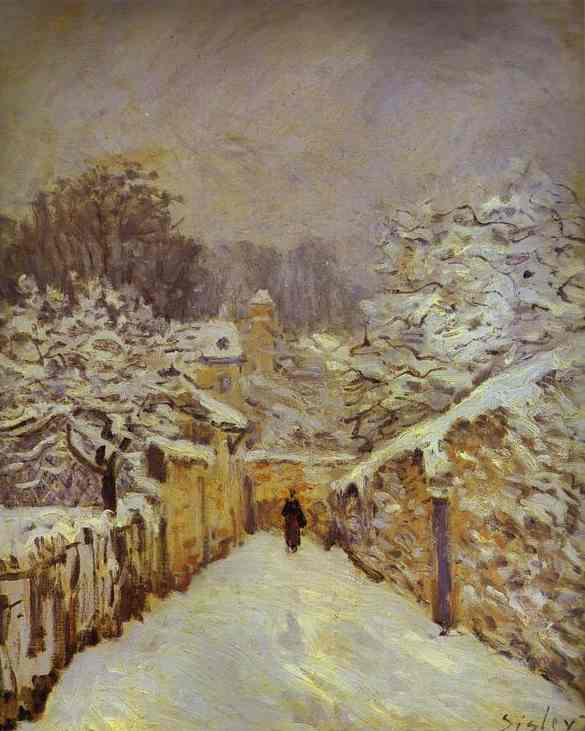
La neige à Louveciennes (Snow at Louveciennes), by Alfred Sisley.

The piece is one of four Debussy preludes in both books whose title origins are unknown. David Schiff suggests that the inspiration for the title could have stemmed from a painting depicting a snowy landscape. This was an extremely popular backdrop among Impressionist artists like Claude Monet or Alfred Sisley; the latter painted Snow at Louveciennes. Furthermore, Debussy's inspiration from Russian composer Modest Mussorgsky is evident in this piece through his utilization of a "block-like dissonant chord" just before the middle part of the piece.

== History ==
Debussy dated this prelude December 27, 1909, a day after he wrote Les collines d'Anacapri. Critical music writer Victor Lederer states how the dates Debussy wrote at the top of some of his preludes are more likely the date he completed the pieces rather than the day he started writing them, given that some of them were quite long and musically complex. The piece was first published in April 1910, along with the rest of his preludes from Book I. It premiered later that year at the Salle Érard in Paris, with Debussy himself performing the work.

== Musical analysis ==
=== Placement within Preludes, Book I ===
Debussy was known for being extremely particular in organizing his preludes. Pianist and musical writer Paul Roberts asserts that this prelude, along with the two that immediately follow it, forms "the central arch" of Book I's structure, since the three pieces provide the most "dramatic contrast" out of all the preludes in the first book. The seventh prelude, Ce qu'a vu le vent d'ouest (What the West wind saw), brings about a violent and tumultuous feeling, while the La fille aux cheveux de lin (The Girl with the Flaxen Hair)—the eighth—evokes a feeling of warmth and gentleness. In complete contrast to these two, Des pas sur la neige exudes a sense of isolation, with Lederer describing the prelude as a "stark expression of loneliness and desolation." By placing these three preludes in this particular order, Debussy ensured that arguably the most technically challenging composition of the collection (Vent d'ouest) was sandwiched in-between the two that are the simplest to play out of the twenty-four.

=== Composition ===
The prelude is in binary form, which was one of the most common forms that Debussy composed in. The A section lasts from bars 1–15, followed by the B part in measures 16–31 and finally a coda in the last five bars. Although the prelude stays in its home key and does not modulate, it goes on to explore all twelve semitones in the octave throughout the piece. It also makes use of different modes, specifically the A♭ scale in Mixolydian and Dorian modes, as well as the whole tone scale in C. Its texture consists of three layers that remains unbroken for almost all of the prelude.

The piece begins with a three-note motif based around the tonic pedal of D, rising to E and then F, constantly shifting between dissonance and resolution. It has been suggested that the D–E and E–F pattern throughout the prelude symbolizes the footprints made in the snow by both the right and left foot in alternating fashion. The middle section sees the utilization of complex dissonant chords leading up to the climax of the piece, which evokes a sense of sorrow. The opening motif then repeats itself with increased dissonance, before arriving at a new passage where the ascending melody withdraws from the "sighing" chords. Although the melody at the end is firmly rooted in G minor, the last chord is in the tonic of D minor. Coupled with the morendo and piano pianissimo dynamic markings, this gives the impression that the prelude simply flickers off without resolving itself.
