= Préludes (Debussy) =

Piano pieces by Claude Debussy

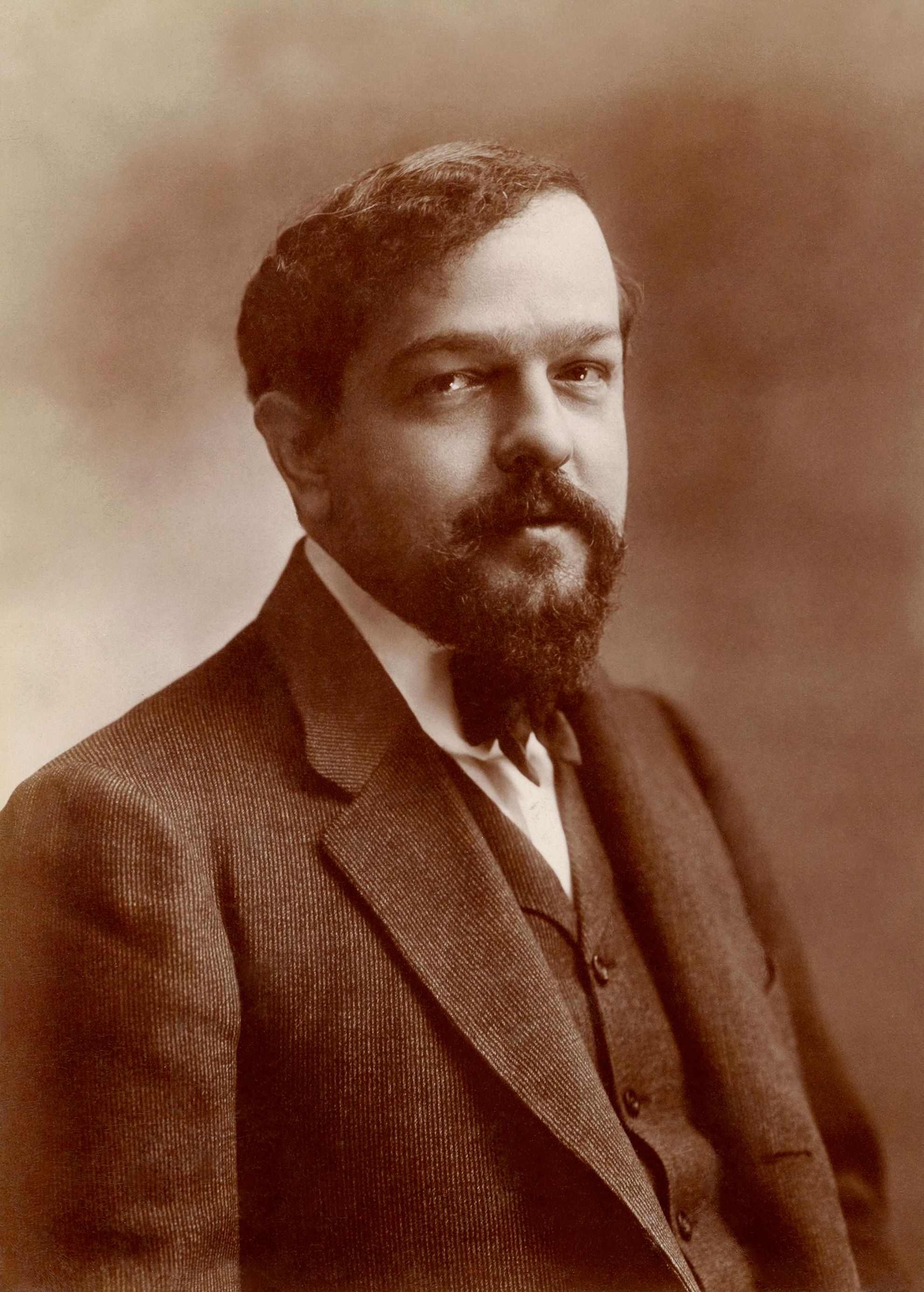
Composer Claude Debussy

Claude Debussy's Préludes are 24 pieces for solo piano, divided into two books of 12 preludes each. Unlike some notable collections of preludes from prior times, such as Chopin's Op. 28 preludes, or the preludes from Johann Sebastian Bach's The Well-Tempered Clavier, Debussy's do not follow a strict pattern of tonal centers. Each book was written in a matter of months, at an unusually fast pace for Debussy. Book I was written between December 1909 and February 1910, and Book II was written between 1911 and 1912.

== Performance history ==
On 3 May 1911, pianist Jane Mortier premiered the first book of preludes at the Salle Pleyel in Paris. German-English pianist Walter Morse Rummel, a student of Leopold Godowsky, premiered the second book in 1913 in London.

Debussy and other pianists who gave early performances of the preludes (including Ricardo Viñes) played them in groups of three or four, which remains a popular approach today. This allows performers to choose preludes with which they have the strongest affinity, or those to which their particular gifts are most suited.

There is a strong tonal relationship between the preludes that suggests that their published order is not arbitrary. For example, the first three preludes of the first book (Danseuses de Delphes, Voiles, and Le Vent dans la Plaine) make continued references to the key of B♭. Although these references come and go, it creates a strong sense of fluidity and connection between these preludes.

The order of the preludes is not considered imperative (as it is with Chopin's preludes, for example). Several pianists have performed them out of order; and at least one recording, by Ivan Ilić, changes the order entirely.

The first complete recording of both books was made in England in 1938 by South African pianist Adolph Hallis.

== Pieces ==
Book I		Book II	
1.	Danseuses de Delphes: Lent et grave (Dancers of Delphi)	1.	Brouillards: Modéré (Mists)
2.	Voiles: Modéré (Veils/Sails)	2.	Feuilles mortes: Lent et mélancolique (Dead Leaves)
3.	Le vent dans la plaine: Animé (The Wind in the Plain)	3.	La puerta del Vino: Mouvement de Habanera; The title refers to one of the gates of the Alhambra in Granada (a city previously evoked in La soirée dans Grenade)
4.	«Les sons et les parfums tournent dans l'air du soir»: Modéré ("The sounds and fragrances swirl through the evening air")	4.	«Les fées sont d'exquises danseuses»: Rapide et léger ("Fairies are exquisite dancers")
5.	Les collines d'Anacapri: Très modéré (The Hills of Anacapri)	5.	Bruyères: Calme (Heather/Town in Eastern France)
6.	Des pas sur la neige: Triste et lent (Footsteps in the Snow)	6.	Général Lavine – eccentric: Dans le style et le mouvement d'un Cakewalk
7.	Ce qu'a vu le vent d'ouest: Animé et tumultueux (What the West Wind Has Seen)	7.	La terrasse des audiences du clair de lune: Lent (The Terrace of Moonlight Audiences)
8.	La fille aux cheveux de lin: Très calme et doucement expressif (The Girl with the Flaxen Hair)	8.	Ondine: Scherzando
9.	La sérénade interrompue: Modérément animé (Interrupted Serenade)	9.	Hommage à S. Pickwick Esq. P.P.M.P.C.: Grave (Homage to S. Pickwick)
10.	La cathédrale engloutie: Profondément calme (The engulfed Cathedral)	10.	Canope: Très calme et doucement triste (Canopic Jar)
11.	La danse de Puck: Capricieux et léger (Puck's Dance)	11.	Les tierces alternées: Modérément animé (Alternating Thirds)
12.	Minstrels: Modéré	12.	Feux d'artifice: Modérément animé (Fireworks)

== Titles ==
In the original editions, Debussy had the titles placed at the end of each work, allowing performers to experience each prelude without being influenced by its titles beforehand.

Two of the titles were set in quotation marks by Debussy because they are, in fact, quotations: «Les sons et les parfums tournent dans l'air du soir» is from Charles Baudelaire's poem Harmonie du soir ("Evening Harmony"), from his volume Les Fleurs du mal. «Les fées sont d'exquises danseuses» is from J. M. Barrie's book Peter Pan in Kensington Gardens, which Debussy's daughter had received as a gift.

At least one title is poetically vague: The exact meaning of Voiles, the first book's second prelude, is impossible to ascertain; in French, voiles can mean either "veils" or "sails".

== Orchestrations and adaptations ==
Numerous orchestrations have been made of the various preludes, mostly of La fille aux cheveux de lin and La cathédrale engloutie. Complete orchestrations of all 24 preludes include versions by Pavica Gvozdić, Peter Breiner, Luc Brewaeys, Hans Henkemans and Colin Matthews. Sean Osborn and conductor Noam Zur have orchestrated the first book.

Some of the Préludes were adapted to form the dynamic soundtrack of Untitled Goose Game.
