= La sérénade interrompue =

Piano composition by Claude Debussy

La sérénade interrompue
Performed by Parizia Prati

La sérénade interrompue (The Interrupted Serenade) is a musical composition for solo piano by French composer Claude Debussy. It is the ninth piece in Book I of Debussy's Préludes (1909–10). It takes about three minutes to perform.

== Composition ==
The piece opens with an introductory passage whose chief feature is its hesitant pizzicato manner. The main theme slowly evolves, and although it is not a combative force here, it comes across as somewhat nocturnal in mood and having both nonchalance and allure in its lithe manner. The rhythmic elements appear throughout and close the impressionistic piece in the same kind of hesitant fashion heard in the opening.
