= Les collines d'Anacapri =

1909 musical composition by Claude Debussy

"Les collines d'Anacapri" (The Hills of Anacapri) is a musical composition for solo piano by French composer Claude Debussy. It is the fifth piece in Debussy's first book of Préludes. Composed in 1909, it was inspired by the town of Anacapri, on the island of Capri in the Gulf of Naples, which the composer never visited, despite some non-authoritative sources stating the opposite.

The piece takes an average of around three minutes to perform, and has a lively, energetic theme in the key of B major. The time signature is written as 12/16 = 2/4, indicating a frequent change of pulse between a compound triple metre and a simple duple metre. The melody imitates bells and contains snippets of tarantella. Two Italian songs are quoted, a chanson populaire and a sultry love song. All these themes merge at the end before a short fanfare, marked lumineux, concludes the piece.
