= Louis Brassin =

Belgian pianist, composer and educator (1840–1884)

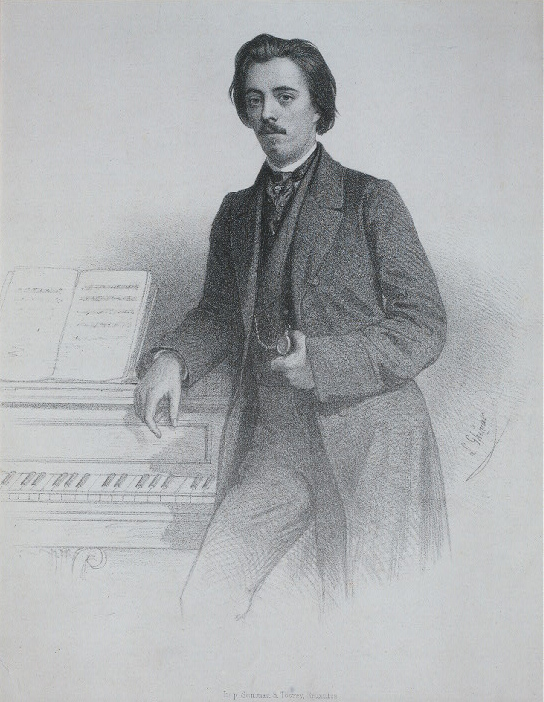
Louis Brassin

Louis Brassin (24 June 1840 – 17 May 1884) was a Belgian pianist, composer and music educator. He is best known now for his piano transcription of the Magic Fire Music from Wagner's Die Walküre.

== Career ==
Louis Brassin was born in Aix-la-Chapelle in 1840. His father was a baritone named de Brassine, whose career took him and his family abroad. Louis gave his first concert at the age of six, in Hamburg. At age seven he entered the Leipzig Conservatory as a pupil of Ignaz Moscheles. In 1852 he went on concert tours with his two brothers. In 1857 he adopted the surname Brassin. In 1866-67 he taught at the Stern Conservatory in Berlin, succeeding Hans von Bülow, then resumed concertising. He was piano professor at the Brussels Conservatoire 1868-78, and played an important role in the musical life of the country. Among his pupils there were Edgar Tinel, Arthur De Greef, Franz Rummel and Alfred Wotquenne. In 1878 he took over the piano class of Theodor Leschetizky at the Saint Petersburg Conservatory, where his pupils included Vasily Safonov, Wassily Sapellnikoff and Genary Korganov.

He died in Saint Petersburg in 1884, aged 43.

== Transcriptions ==
Brassin's piano transcription of the Magic Fire Music from Wagner's Die Walküre was long a concert favourite, and has been recorded many times. His other Wagner transcriptions from the Ring Cycle were: Valhalla, Siegmund's Love Song, Ride of the Valkyries (Die Walküre), and Forest Murmurs (Siegfried). Pianists who have recorded these pieces include Josef Hofmann, Ignaz Friedman, Isador Goodman, Michael Ponti, Jean-Yves Thibaudet and Severin von Eckardstein.

He also transcribed:

- J. S. Bach's Toccata and Fugue in D minor, BWV 565
- the Soldiers' Chorus from Gounod's Faust
- 3 pieces after Domenico Scarlatti.

== Original works ==
Brassin wrote two piano concertos and two German operettas (Der Thronfolger, The Heir to the Throne and Der Missionär, The Missionary), as well as many smaller, now largely forgotten piano pieces.

- Première grande polonaise
- Deuxième grande polonaise, Op. 18
- 3eme Grande Polonaise
- Feuillet d'album (Album Leaf)
- Étude de concert
- Impressions d'Automne (Herbst-Eindrücke) Trois etudes
- Menuet, Gavotte et Gigue
- Polka de la Princesse
- Sérénade
- Rêverie pastoral
- Rêverie
- Second Galop de Concert fantastique
- Les Adieux, morceau caractéristiques
- Grandes Etudes de Concert. Op. 12 [No. 1-6]
- Mazurka de Salon, Op. 14
- Au clair de la lune, Nocturne, Op. 17

== Sources ==
- Harold C. Schonberg, The Great Pianists, pp. 269, 342
- Eric Blom, ed., Grove Dictionary of Music and Musicians, 5th ed, 1954, Vol. 1, p. 918
