= Noam Zur =

Israeli conductor

Noam Zur (Hebrew: נעם צור; born 1981) is an Israeli conductor. the New Chief conductor (Director Titular 2018–2020) in Argentinian State orchestra of Salta (Orquesta sinfonica de Salta)
Since July 2015 he is the artistic director of the Tino Pattiera Opera Arias Festival in Dubrovnik, Croatia and from 2016 the Principal Guest Conductor of the Dubrovnik Symphony Orchestra
Between 2011 and 2015 he was the principal conductor and artistic associate of the Kammerphilharmonie Frankfurt.

== Biography ==
Zur was educated in Israel, Germany and the US, and studied Music and Philosophy at Tel-Aviv University, graduating in 2002.

Maestro Zur gave his German Radio debut with the WDR Rundfunkorchester (Cologne) in September 2013 and his Louisville Orchestra (Kentucky USA) debut in November 2013 and with the Romanian Enescu Philharmonic in January 2014. Further first performances took place in 2012 with the Philharmonie Südwestfalen, Germany, the Pilsen Philharmonic (Czech Republic), the Arthur Rubinstein Philharmonic Lodz, and with the Pilsen Symphony Orchestra (Czech Republic). Zur has multiple re-invitations to the Israel Symphony Orchestra, the Haifa Symphony Orchestra, and the National Operas in Iasi and Bucharest. He regularly returns to the Filarmonica de Stat Transilvania, Romania, where he was also a guest professor at the “Gheorghe Dima” Music Academy in the years 2013 and 2014.

In 2011–2012, Zur gave his highly praised North American Début at the Chautauqua Festival in NY, USA, (August 2012) and with l'Orchestre d'Auvergne in France.

During the same season he conducted the Kammerphilharmonie Frankfurt at the Kulturwald Festival in Bavaria (Die Zauberflöte & Symphony concert with Pianist Daniil Trifonov), the Israel Philharmonic Orchestra, Belgrade Philharmonic, theJerusalem Radio Symphony Orchestra and gave his débuts with the Israel Symphony Orchestra and the Israeli Opera, the Romanian National Opera Iasi, and the National Opera Bucharest, as well as performing with many other orchestras in Europe.

Since 2001, Zur has performed in major concert halls and with leading orchestras in Germany, Israel, Switzerland, Austria, France, Estonia, Romania, Scandinavia, and Italy. In 2006, Pierre Boulez chose Noam Zur as his assistant as well as consultant and conductor for the Lucerne Festival Academy (2006–2008).

As part of the European Cultural Capital festivities of Essen, he led the new productions of Henze's Elegie für junge Liebende and a concert version of Bizet's Les pêcheurs de perles. The 2009–2010 season saw him heading the premiere of La Sylphide with the Aalto Ballet Company. Noam Zur was Principal Resident Conductor at the Aalto Theatre in Essen until August 2010.

Noam Zur's 2010–2011 engagements included a tour with the Kammerphilharmonie Frankfurt in Israel, and debuts with the Israel Camerata, Belgrade Philharmonic, Netania-Kibbutz Chamber Orchestra and the Israel Symphony Orchestra. He also returned to the Wiener Volksoper, opening their 2010–11 season with Die Fledermaus and during the holiday season for Hänsel und Gretel.

In 2014, Noam Zur started foraying into the field of composition and orchestration, performing part of Debussy's first book of preludes with the Young Israel Philharmonic Orchestra in December. Further preludes have since been performed in North America and Europe, with the premiere of the entire set scheduled for 2016.
