= Franz Rummel =

German pianist

Franz Rummel (January 11, 1853 – May 2, 1901) was a German pianist, born in England and active across continental Europe.

Rummel was born in London into a prominent German musical family, the son of pianist Joseph Rummel and grandson of composer and conductor Christian Rummel. He studied under Louis Brassin at the Brussels Conservatory, winning the first prize in 1872. He gave his first concert in Brussels, on November 24, 1872. In 1877–78 he toured through the Netherlands with Ole Bull and Minnie Hauk, and embarked on American tours in 1878, 1886, and 1898. He taught 1884–85 at Julius Stern's Conservatory, and then at Theodor Kullak's, both in Berlin. In 1897 he received the title of Professor from Eduard, Duke of Anhalt. By the start of his third American tour in 1898, he had played in about 700 concerts. Franz was the first pianist to play at Carnegie Hall in 1891.

He married a daughter of telegraph inventor Samuel Morse; one of their sons, Walter Morse Rummel, was also a well-known pianist.
