= Flax (color) =

Color

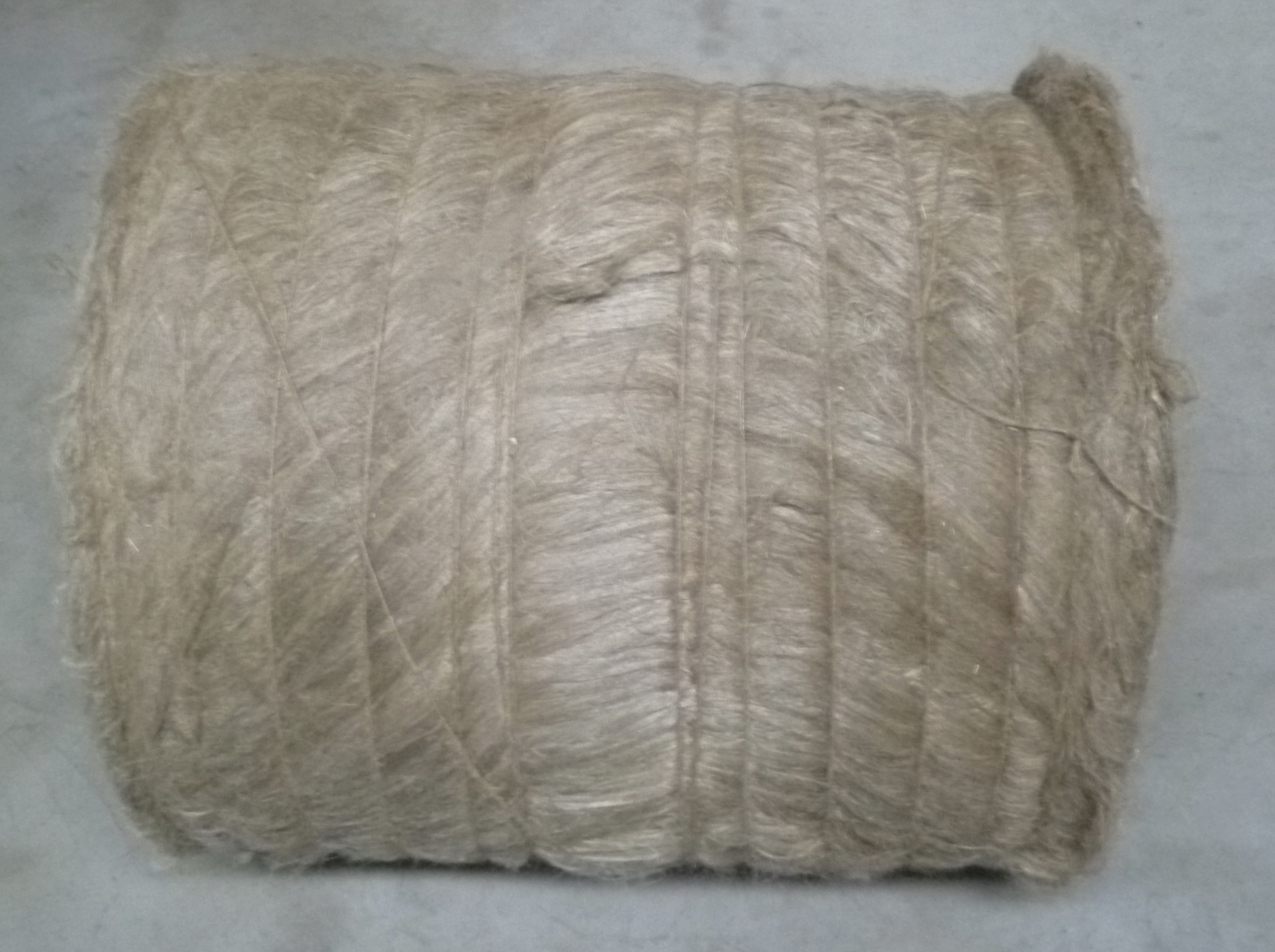
- Dressed flax

Color coordinates
- Hex triplet: #EEDC82
- sRGB^{B} (r, g, b): (238, 220, 130)
- HSV (h, s, v): (50°, 45%, 93%)
- CIELCh_{uv} (L, C, h): (87, 63, 75°)
- Source: Maerz and Paul
- ISCC–NBS descriptor: Light greenish yellow
- B: Normalized to [0–255] (byte)

Flax or flaxen is a pale yellowish-gray, the color of straw or unspun dressed flax. The first recorded use of flax as a color name in English was in 1915, but flaxen had been used to describe hair color in David Copperfield, by Charles Dickens in 1849: Mr. Omer's granddaughter, Minnie, is described as "a pretty little girl with long, flaxen, curling hair."

== See also ==
- Lists of colors
- Flaxen gene
