= Voiles =

Composition for piano by Claude Debussy

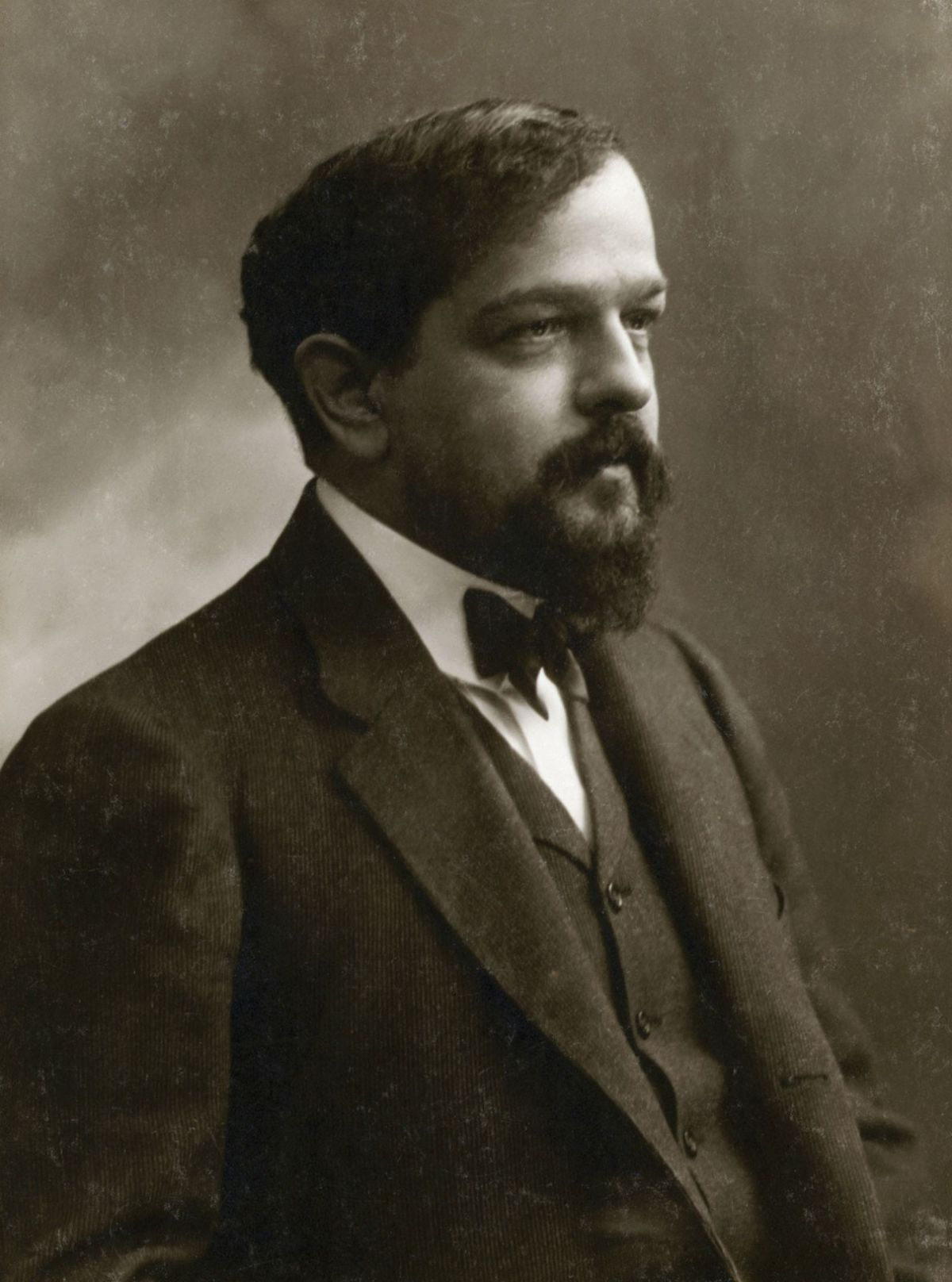
Claude Debussy ca. 1908

"Voiles" is a musical composition for solo piano by French composer Claude Debussy that was composed in 1909. It is the second piece in Debussy's first book of préludes, published in 1910. The title may be translated as either veils or sails; both meanings can be connected to the musical structure (see below).

Except for some mild, localized chromaticism and a short pentatonic passage, the entire piece uses the whole-tone scale.

In their published form, the Préludes have their individual titles printed not at the start, but at the end—and in parentheses.

== Musical analysis ==
A whole-tone scale in Debussy's "Voiles", mm. 1–4.

The composition studies the whole-tone scale intensively, with the exception of a brief six-measure section in the pentatonic scale. The structure of the piece follows a variation on ternary (A–B–A′) form. A begins in bar 1; B begins in bar 42; and A′ begins in bar 48. This three-part form is articulated by the dynamic structure: A and A′ have only soft dynamics (piano or softer), while B has a wider dynamic from piano to forte. The B section is also set apart by a faster tempo and increased density of notes. Finally, the A and A′ sections are characterized by a whole-tone scale, while the B section is characterized by the pentatonic scale. The whole-tone scale and the soft dynamics give the A and A′ sections a mysterious and eerie mood. In the B section, the louder dynamics, the faster passage, and the more consonant and familiar pentatonic scale give the listener a break from the eerie tone, allowing a brief moment of clarity.

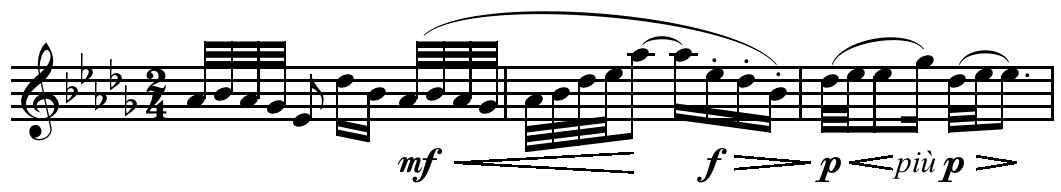
Pentatonic scale in Debussy's "Voiles", Préludes, Book I, no. 2, mm. 43–45.

If interpreting the movement in light of "veils", the eerie, mysterious mood of the A section sounds veiled. The clearer, more open sound of the B section generates an impression that the veil is removed, but returns for the A′ section. If one takes "sails" as a possible understanding of the title, that leads to a possible image of a becalmed ship in the A and A′ sections, with the clearer, louder, brighter B section denoting a more open sea and sails full of wind. Generally however, the structure of the piece is difficult to categorise. Some say that the pentatonic section forms the B part but, in truth, it is not clear enough to state it is definitely A–B–A. Others argue that it follows a rounded binary form more than ternary form due to the fact that there is an A part, B part and then another section at the end, concluding all of his ideas.

== See also ==
- List of compositions by Claude Debussy
