= Walter Morse Rummel =

Pianist (1887–1953)

Walter Morse Rummel (July 19, 1887 – May 2, 1953) was a prominent pianist, especially associated with Claude Debussy's works, as well as a composer and music editor. He was of German-English descent and active mainly in France.

Rummel was born in Berlin to Franz Rummel and Cornelia "Leila" Morse Rummel. His father was from a prominent family of German musicians, and his mother was a daughter of telegraph inventor Samuel Morse. He studied piano with Leopold Godowsky and composition with Hugo Kaun, before moving to Paris in 1908. On his way to Paris he met Ignacy Jan Paderewski in Switzerland, who called some of his piano compositions "not far from masterpieces" and invited him to stay for a year as a pupil; Rummel however turned down the invitation and continued to Paris. While in Paris he met Claude Debussy and became a leading interpreter and proponent of Debussy's piano compositions. He died in Bordeaux in 1953.

In addition to his own performances and compositions, Rummel had an interest in preserving and arranging earlier music. He edited several volumes of early music, and published piano arrangements of organ works by Bach and Vivaldi, as well as four books of piano arrangements of cantata movements of Bach.
