= 5th parallel =

5th parallel may refer to:

- 5th parallel north, a circle of latitude in the Northern Hemisphere
- 5th parallel south, a circle of latitude in the Southern Hemisphere
- Consecutive fifths or parallel fifths, a term used in music
