= Contrapuntal motion =

Movement of two melodic lines with respect to each other

In music theory, contrapuntal motion is the general movement of two or more melodic lines with respect to each other. In traditional four-part harmony, it is important that lines maintain their independence, an effect which can be achieved by the judicious use of the four types of contrapuntal motion: parallel motion, similar motion, contrary motion, and oblique motion.

== Parallel motion ==
Parallel motion is motion in the same direction, keeping the same interval between them. For example:

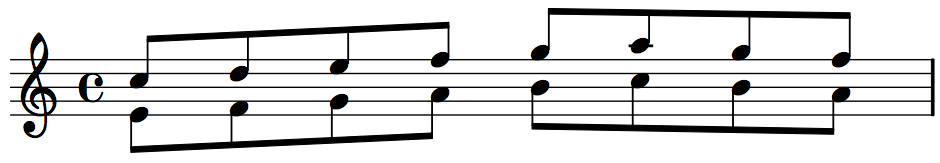

Parallel motion at an interval of a perfect fifth is known as parallel or consecutive fifths, and at an interval of an octave is known as parallel or consecutive octaves. Perfect intervals, i.e. the (perfect) unison, fifth and octave, are generally avoided in traditional counterpoint because they offer the lines so little independence from each other.

In first-species counterpoint, it is recommended to limit parallel thirds or sixths to three consecutive uses of a given intervallic size.

Chords between which all factors or voices move in parallel motion are called parallel chords. This motion is called planing.

== Similar motion ==
Similar motion is motion in the same direction, but with the interval between them changing. In other words, both lines move up, or both lines move down, but the interval between them is different in the first chord and the second chord. For example:

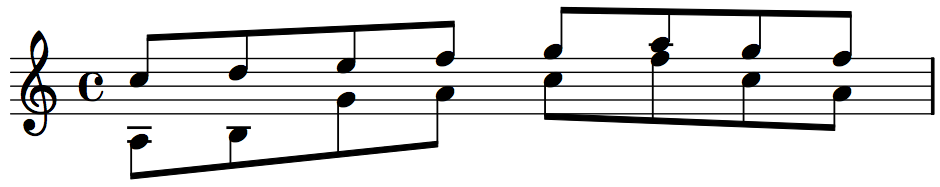

An important example of similar motion is in horn fifths.

== Contrary motion ==
Contrary motion is motion in opposite directions. That is, when one of the lines moves up, the other line moves down (that is, in inversion). If the voices always move by the same intervals (in opposite directions) they are said to be in strict contrary motion.

The following example shows two voices in contrary motion:

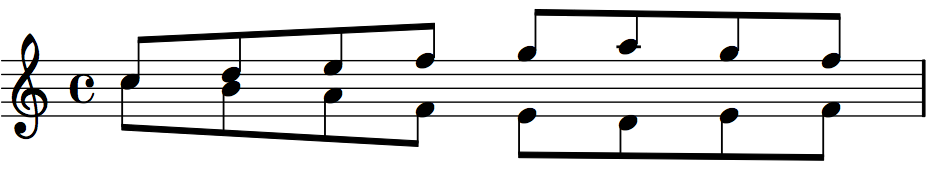

Contrary motion is important to maintain the independence of the melodic movement in contrapuntal writing as it creates the most independence between voices.

== Oblique motion ==
Oblique motion is motion of one melodic line while the other remains at the same pitch. For example:

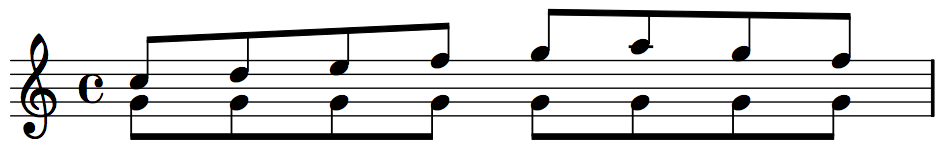

If extended for enough time, the note that stays on the same pitch can be called a drone.

Similar and oblique motion provide less independence than contrary motion, but more than parallel motion.

== See also ==
- Counterpoint
- Melodic motion
- Voice leading

== Bibliography ==
- Benward, Bruce; Saker, Marilyn (2009). Music in Theory and Practice. Vol. II (Eighth ed.). New York: McGraw-Hill. ISBN 978-0-07-310188-0.
- Laitz, Steven G. (2012). The Complete Musician: An Integrated Approach to Tonal Theory, Analysis, and Listening (Third ed.). New York: Oxford University Press. ISBN 978-0-19-974278-3.
