= Barbershopera =

- Type: Theatre group
- Location: London, England
- Website: www.barbershopera.com

Barbershopera is a London-based theatre group that creates comedy musicals in a cappella four-part harmony. The group is noted for its unique format, as all the shows feature three male performers and one female performer and the stories of the shows often use this aspect to inform the comedy content of the shows. To date, the group have written three full shows, all of which have won awards at the Edinburgh Festival as well as going on to run in London. Their first show, Barbershopera! was adapted as a BBC Radio 4 afternoon play in March 2010. The current Barbershopera team consists of Rob Castell, Tom Sadler, Pete Sorel-Cameron, Lara Stubbs and Sarah Tipple.

== Background ==
Barbershopera was conceived by Rob Castell and Tom Sadler whilst at the University of East Anglia. In early 2004, Castell and Sadler were performing regularly as part of a barbershop quartet, along with several other male students including current member Pete Sorel-Cameron. Sadler suggested the name 'Barbershopera' after discussions of evolving the idea of a four-part harmony comedy musical. It wasn't however until Spring 2007 that any of the initial ideas came to fruition, when Sadler and Castell began writing stand-alone comedy songs and performing small-scale gigs alongside friends Becci Gemmell and Geoff Lawson. After gathering momentum, director Sarah Tipple came on board and the group began working towards creating a full-scale show. In Spring 2008, Lara Stubbs and Mark Hole joined the group to form the original cast of four for the debut show, simply entitled Barbershopera!, which was written by Castell and Sadler in collaboration with director Tipple. The show was an Edinburgh hit, winning Musical Theatre Matters awards and receiving rave reviews, before transferring to Theatre503 in Battersea, London. Since then, Castell and Sadler have written two more shows, with Tipple contributing to the book as well as directing. Both shows, The Barber of Shavingham and Apocalypse No! (sometimes advertised as Apocalypse Noel!) have won Musical Theatre Matters awards and transferred to London's Trafalgar Studios, which is part of the Ambassadors Theatre Group. In addition, the group have toured the UK and travelled to South Korea where Castell and Stubbs were recipients of Best Actor and Best Actress awards at the Daegu International Musical Festival. The Radio 4 adaptation of the first show was recorded in March 2010 and was positively received by audiences as well as being featured on Pick of the Week.
