= Hypodorian mode =

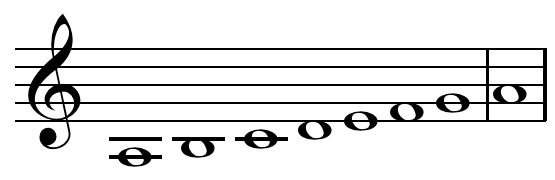
Hypodorian mode on D (only missing the high B♭).

The Hypodorian mode, a musical term literally meaning 'below Dorian', derives its name from a tonos or octave species of ancient Greece which, in its diatonic genus, is built from a tetrachord consisting (in rising direction) of a semitone followed by two whole tones. The rising scale for the octave is a single tone followed by two conjoint tetrachords of this type. This is roughly the same as playing all the white notes of a piano from A to A: A | B C D E | (E) F G A. Although this scale in medieval theory was employed in Dorian and Hypodorian, from the mid-sixteenth century and in modern music theory they came to be known as the Aeolian and Hypoaeolian modes.

The term Hypodorian came to be used to describe the second mode of Western church music. This mode is the plagal counterpart of the authentic first mode, which was also called Dorian. The ecclesiastical Hypodorian mode was defined in two ways: (1) as the diatonic octave species from A to A, divided at the mode final D and composed of a lower tetrachord of tone–semitone–tone, ending on D, plus a pentachord tone–semitone–tone–tone continuing from D, and (2) as a mode whose final was D and whose ambitus was G–B♭ (that is, with B♮ below the final and B♭ above it). In addition, the note F, corresponding to the reciting note or tenor of the second psalm tone, was regarded as an important secondary center.
