= Four-part harmony =

Music written for four voices or instruments

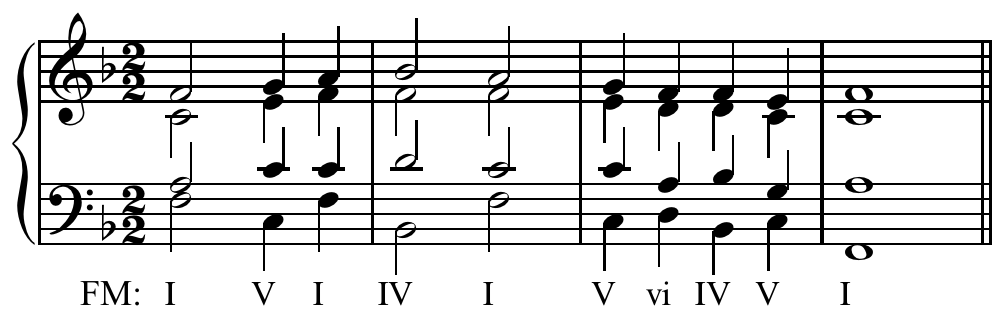
Four-voice texture in the Genevan psalter: Old 124th.

Four-part harmony is music written for four voices, or for some other musical medium—four musical instruments or a single keyboard instrument, for example—for which the various musical parts can give a different note for each chord of the music.

The four main voices are typically labelled as soprano (or treble and countertenor), alto (contralto, countertenor or mezzo), tenor, and bass. Because the human voice has a limited range, different voice types are usually not able to sing pitches that lie outside of their specific range.

The effort required to perform four-part harmony varies greatly. Pieces written in such a style can be usually executed by a single keyboard player, a group of 4 instruments (or singers), or even a large choir with multiple singers per part.

== In European classical music ==
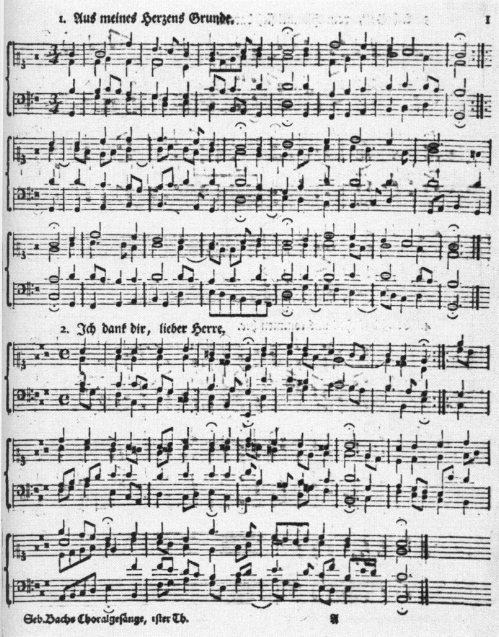
Examples of baroque four-part writing: two chorale harmonizations by Johann Sebastian Bach (BWV 269 and BWV 347).

In the baroque era, a set of rules developed for voice leading in four-part harmony. In these rules, the bass voice would be assigned the root of the chord, although it can occasionally be assigned the fifth or the third. If the chord is a triad, the root is generally doubled by one of the other voices. When two voices are harmonized in perfect intervals (fourths, fifths and octaves), repeats of the same interval between the two voices (also known as moving in parallels) are almost always avoided.

Chord movement in four-part writing is mostly dependent on common tones. In a progression, at least one note generally should be held between both chords. If there are no common tones, four-part harmonization depends on minimizing movement across parts. Many of the rules of four-part writing also correspond with writing in Jazz harmony

Another rule concerns perfect cadences. In such cadences, the leading tone (the seventh scale degree) must resolve step-wise to the tonic. That is, the voice that plays the leading tone must resolve up to the tonic, and if the chord is a dominant seventh chord, the subdominant should resolve to the mediant.

Another concern of four-part writing is tessitura. Since the music is usually written for four-part choirs, each part should be able to be sung by the appropriate section of the choir, thus it should remain in the appropriate pitch range. As well as that, each voice should be easy to sing, meaning that large intervals within the same voice are to be avoided, instead favoring step-wise motion. Voices should also not overlap: the pitch sung by the alto should not be higher than that of the soprano, and so on for the other voices. Voices should also remain suitably close to each other, usually within an octave of each adjacent voice, except for the bass.

These rules were generally followed during the common practice period. Nowadays, they are usually taught in music theory classes, but most compositions follow less strict rules, if not outright disregarding them. The conventions are particularly associated with the study and analysis of tonal harmony and four-part chorale writing.

== See also ==
- Chorale
- Harmony
- Hymn tune
- SATB
- Voice leading
