= Part (music) =

Component of a musical composition

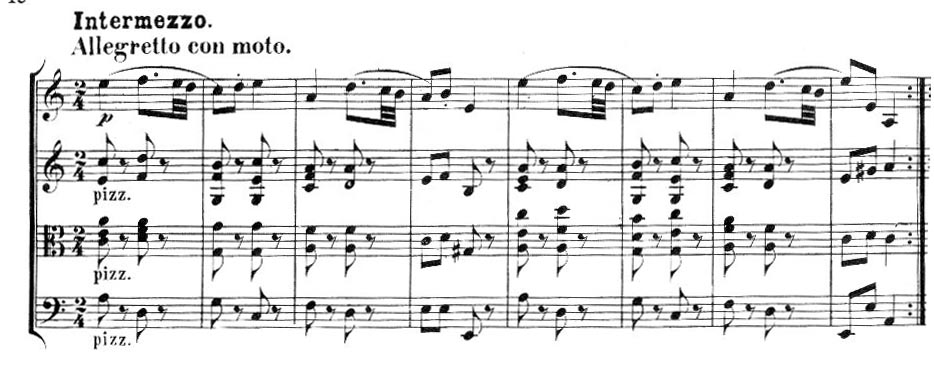
A score with four parts, for Mendelssohn's opus 13 string quartet. The second violin and the viola "parts" above often include two or three simultaneous notes: in some sense, these parts assemble several parts, played by a single player.

A part in music refers to a component of a musical composition. Because there are multiple ways to separate these components, there are several contradictory senses in which the word "part" is used:

- any individual melody (or voice), whether vocal or instrumental, that can be abstracted as continuous and independent from other notes being performed simultaneously in polyphony. Within the music played by a single pianist, one can often identify outer parts (the top and bottom parts) or an inner part (those in between). On the other hand, within a choir, "outer parts" and "inner parts" would refer to music performed by different singers. (See § Polyphony and part-writing)
- the musical instructions for any individual instrument or voice (often given as a handwritten, printed, or digitized document) of sheet music (as opposed to the full score which shows all parts of the ensemble in the same document). A musician's part usually does not contain instructions for the other players in the ensemble, only instructions for that individual.
- the music played by any group of musicians who all perform together for a given piece; in a symphony orchestra, a dozen or more cello players may all play "the same part" even if they each have their own physical copy of the music. This part may be in unison or may be harmonized, and may even sometimes contain counter-melodies within it. A percussion part may sometimes only contain rhythm. This sense of "part" does not require a written copy of the music; a bass player in a rock band "plays the bass part" even if there is no written version of the song.
- a section in the large-scale form of a piece. (See § Musical form)

== Polyphony and part-writing ==
A bar from J.S. Bach's "Fugue No.17 in A flat", BWV 862, from Das Wohltemperierte Clavier (Part I), an example of contrapuntal polyphony. The two parts, or voices, on each staff may be distinguished by the direction of the stems., 3, 2, & 1 separately.

Part-writing (or voice leading) is the composition of parts in consideration of harmony and counterpoint. In the context of polyphonic composition the term voice may be used instead of part to denote a single melodic line or textural layer. The term is generic, and is not meant to imply that the line should necessarily be vocal in character, instead referring to instrumentation, the function of the line within the counterpoint structure, or simply to register.

The historical development of polyphony and part-writing is a central thread through European music history. The earliest notated pieces of music in Europe were Gregorian chant melodies. It appears that the Codex Calixtinus (12th century) contains the earliest extant decipherable part music. Many histories of music trace the development of new rules for dissonances, and shifting stylistic possibilities for relationships between parts.

In some places and time periods, part-writing has been systematized as a set of counterpoint rules taught to musicians as part of their early education. One notable example is Johann Fux's Gradus ad Parnassum, which dictates a style of counterpoint writing that resembles the work of the famous Renaissance composer Palestrina. The standard for most Western music theory in the twentieth century is generalized from the work of Classical composers in the common practice period. For example, a recent general music textbook states,

Part writing is derived from four-voice chorales written by J.S. Bach. The late baroque era composer wrote a total of 371 harmonized chorales. Today most students' reference Albert Riemenschneider's 1941 compilation of Bach chorales.

Polyphony and part-writing are also present in many popular music and folk music traditions, although they may not be described as explicitly or systematically as they sometimes are in the Western tradition.

The lead part or lead voice is the most prominent, melodically important voice (often the highest in pitch but not necessarily) and is played by a lead instrument (e.g. a lead vocalist).

== Musical form ==
In musical forms, a part may refer to a subdivision in the structure of a piece. Sometimes "part" is a title given by the composer or publisher to the main sections of a large-scale work, especially oratorios. For example, Handel's Messiah, which is organized into Part I, Part II, and Part III, each of which contains multiple scenes and one or two dozen individual arias or choruses.

Other times, "part" is used to refer in a more general sense to any identifiable section of the piece. This is for example the case in the widely used ternary form, usually schematized as A–B–A. In this form the first and third parts (A) are musically identical, or very nearly so, while the second part (B) in some way provides a contrast with them. In this meaning of part, similar terms used are section, strain, or turn.

== See also ==
- Partbook
- Cantus firmus
