= Voice leading =

Decision-making consideration when arranging voices in musical composition

A phrase in J. S. Bach's four-part chorale, Schau, lieber Gott, wie meine Feind (mm. 5–6). The four voices (SATB) each follow independent melodic lines (with some differences in rhythm) that together create a chord progression ending on a Phrygian half cadence.

Voice leading (or part writing) is the linear progression of individual melodic lines (voices or parts) and their interaction with one another to create harmonies, typically in accordance with the principles of common-practice harmony and counterpoint. These principles include voices sounding smooth and independent, generally minimising movement to common tones as well as steps to the closest chord tone possible, therefore minimising leaps where possible. As a result, different voicings and inversions of chords may provide smoother voice leading.

Rigorous concern for voice leading is of greatest importance in common-practice music, although jazz and pop music also demonstrate attention to voice leading to varying degrees.

The style of voice leading will depend on the performing medium; for example, singing a large leap may be harder than playing it on piano.

== Example ==
The score below shows the first four measures of the C-major prelude from J.S. Bach's The Well-Tempered Clavier, Book 1. Letter (a) presents the original score while (b) and (c) present reductions (simplified versions) intended to clarify the harmony and implied voice leading, respectively.

In (b), the same measures are presented as four block chords (with two inverted): I – II^{4}_{2} – V^{6}_{5} – I.

In (c), the four measures are presented as five horizontal voices identified by the direction of the stems, which are added even though the notes are actually whole notes, making them look like half notes. Notice that each voice consists of just three played notes due to the ties: from top to bottom, (1) E F — E; (2) C D — C; (3) G A G —; (4) E D — E; (5) C — B C. The four chords result from the fact that the voices do not move at the same time.

== History ==
Voice leading developed as an independent concept when Heinrich Schenker stressed its importance in "free counterpoint", as opposed to strict counterpoint. He wrote:

All musical technique is derived from two basic ingredients: voice leading and the progression of scale degrees [i.e. of harmonic roots]. Of the two, voice leading is the earlier and the more original element.

He continued:

The theory of voice leading is to be presented here as a discipline unified in itself; that is, I shall show how [...] it everywhere maintains its inner unity.

Schenker indeed did not present the rules of voice leading merely as contrapuntal rules, but showed how they are inseparable from the rules of harmony and how they form one of the most essential aspects of musical composition. (Note: See Schenkerian analysis: voice leading.)

== Common-practice conventions and pedagogy ==
=== Chord connection ===
An example of parallel fifth in the two lower voices

Western musicians have tended to teach voice leading by focusing on connecting adjacent harmonies because that skill is foundational to meeting larger, structural objectives.

Common-practice conventions dictate that melodic lines should be smooth and independent. To be smooth, they should be primarily conjunct (stepwise), avoid leaps that are difficult to sing, approach and follow leaps with movement in the opposite direction, and correctly handle tendency tones (primarily, the leading-tone, but also the, which often moves down to). To be independent, they should avoid parallel fifths and octaves.

Contrapuntal conventions likewise consider permitted or forbidden melodic intervals in individual parts, intervals between parts, the direction of the movement of the voices with respect to each other, etc. Whether dealing with counterpoint or harmony, these conventions emerge not only from a desire to create easy-to-sing parts but also from the constraints of tonal materials and from the objectives behind writing certain textures.

These conventions are discussed in more detail below.

1. Move each voice the shortest distance possible. One of the main conventions of common-practice part-writing is that, between successive harmonies, voices should avoid leaps and retain common tones as much as possible. This principle was commonly discussed among 17th- and 18th-century musicians as a rule of thumb. For example, Rameau taught "one cannot pass from one note to another but by that which is closest." In the 19th century, as music pedagogy became a more theoretical discipline in some parts of Europe, the 18th-century rule of thumb became codified into a more strict definition. Organist Johann August Dürrnberger coined the term "rule of the shortest way" for it and delineated that:
  1. When a chord contains one or more notes that will be reused in the chords immediately following, then these notes should remain, that is retained in the respective parts.
  2. The parts which do not remain, follow the law of the shortest way (Gesetze des nächsten Weges), that is that each such part names the note of the following chord closest to itself if no forbidden succession arises from this.
  3. If no note at all is present in a chord which can be reused in the chord immediately following, one must apply contrary motion according to the law of the shortest way, that is, if the root progresses upwards, the accompanying parts must move downwards, or inversely, if the root progresses downwards, the other parts move upwards and, in both cases, to the note of the following chord closest to them.
  This rule was taught by Bruckner to Schoenberg and Schenker, who both had followed his classes in Vienna. Schenker re-conceived the principle as the "rule of melodic fluency":
  If one wants to avoid the dangers produced by larger intervals [...], the best remedy is simply to interrupt the series of leaps – that is, to prevent a second leap from occurring by continuing with a second or an only slightly larger interval after the first leap; or one may change the direction of the second interval altogether; finally both means can be used in combination. Such procedures yield a kind of wave-like melodic line which as a whole represents an animated entity, and which, with its ascending and descending curves, appears balanced in all its individual component parts. This kind of line manifests what is called melodic fluency [Fließender Gesang].
  Schenker attributed the rule to Cherubini, but this is the result of a somewhat inexact German translation. Cherubini only said that conjunct movement should be preferred. Franz Stoepel, the German translator, used the expression Fließender Gesang to translate mouvement conjoint. (Note: See Schenkerian analysis.) The concept of Fließender Gesang is a common concept of German counterpoint theory. (Note: See for instance Johann Philipp Kirnberger, Die Kunst des reinen Satzes in der Musik, vol. II, Berlin, Königsberg, 1776, p. 82.) Modern Schenkerians made the concept of "melodic fluency" an important one in their teaching of voice leading.
2. Voice crossing should be avoided except to create melodic interest.
3. Avoid parallel fifths and octaves. To promote voice independence, melodic lines should avoid parallel unisons, parallel fifths, and parallel octaves between any two voices. They should also avoid hidden consecutives, perfect intervals reached by any two voices moving in the same direction, even if not by the same interval, particularly if the higher of the two voices makes a disjunct motion. In organ registers, certain interval combinations and chords are activated by a single key so that playing a melody results in parallel voice leading. These voices, losing independence, are fused into one and the parallel chords are perceived as single tones with a new timbre. This effect is also used in orchestral arrangements; for instance, in Ravel's Boléro starting in part/verse 5, measure 95 the parallel parts of flutes, horn and celesta resemble the sound of an electric organ. In counterpoint, parallel voices are prohibited because they violate the homogeneity of musical texture when independent voices occasionally disappear turning into a new timbre quality and vice versa.

=== Harmonic roles ===
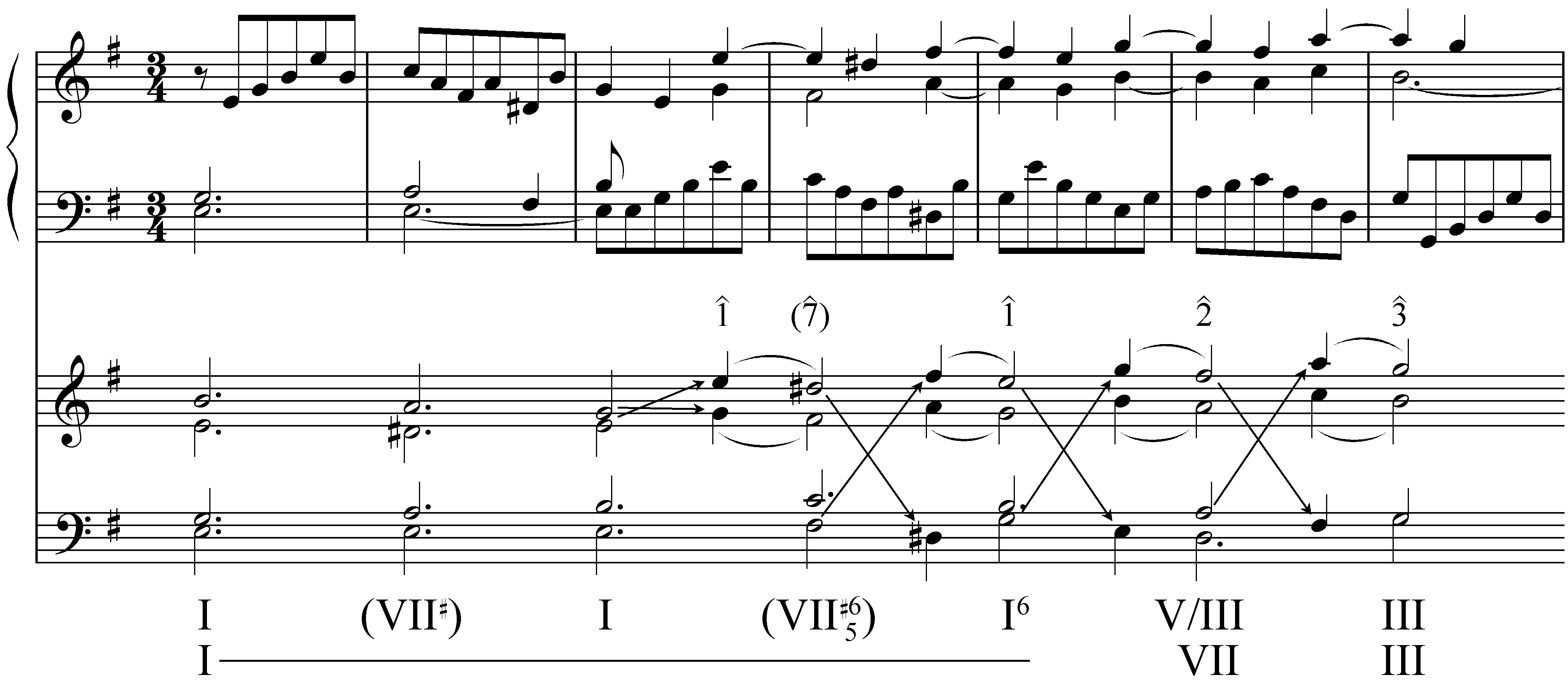
A modern perspective on voice leading in mm. 3–7 of J. S. Bach's Little Prelude in E minor, BWV 941. From the last chord of each measure to the first chord of the next, all melodic movements (excepting those in the bass) are conjunct; inside each measure, however, octave shifts account for a more complex parsimonious voice leading. Original Reduction

As the Renaissance gave way to the Baroque era in the 1600s, part writing reflected the increasing stratification of harmonic roles. This differentiation between outer and inner voices was an outgrowth of both tonality and homophony. In this new Baroque style, the outer voices took a commanding role in determining the flow of the music and tended to move more often by leaps. Inner voices tended to move stepwise or repeat common tones.

A Schenkerian analysis perspective on these roles shifts the discussion somewhat from "outer and inner voices" to "upper and bass voices". Although the outer voices still play the dominant, form-defining role in this view, the leading soprano voice is often seen as a composite line that draws on the voice leadings in each of the upper voices of the imaginary continuo. Approaching harmony from a non-Schenkerian perspective, Dmitri Tymoczko nonetheless also demonstrates such "3+1" voice leading, where "three voices articulate a strongly crossing-free voice leading between complete triads [...], while a fourth voice adds doublings," as a feature of tonal writing.

Neo-Riemannian theory examines another facet of this principle. That theory decomposes movements from one chord to another into one or several "parsimonious movements" between pitch classes instead of actual pitches (i.e., neglecting octave shifts). (Note: Cohn 1997, note 4 writes that the term "parsimony" is used in this context in Ottokar Hostinský, Die Lehre von den musikalischen Klangen, Prag, H. Dominicus, 1879, p. 106. Cohn considers the principe of parsimony to be the same thing as the "law of the shortest way", but this is only partly true.) Such analysis shows the deeper continuity underneath surface disjunctions, as in the Bach example from BWV 941 hereby.

== Jazz and pop music ==
Contemporary styles like jazz and pop treat voice-leading with more mixed importance than common-practice composition. For example, in Jazz Theory, Dariusz Terefenko writes that "[a]t the surface level, jazz voice-leading conventions seem more relaxed than they are in common-practice music." Marc Schonbrun also states that while it is untrue that "popular music has no voice leading in it, [...] the largest amount of popular music is simply conceived with chords as blocks of information, and melodies are layered on top of the chords."

== Bibliography ==
- Cadwallader, Allen; Gagné, David (2011). Analysis of Tonal Music (3rd ed.). Oxford University Press.
- Clendinning, Jane; Marvin, Elizabeth W. (2011). The Musician's Guide to Theory and Analysis (2nd ed.). Norton. ISBN 9780393930818. OCLC 320193510.
- Cohn, Richard (1997). "Neo-Riemannian Operations, Parsimonious Trichords, and Their 'Tonnetz' Representations". Journal of Music Theory. 41 (1): 1–66. JSTOR 843761.
- Kostka, Stefan; Payne, Dorothy (2004). Tonal Harmony (5th ed.). Boston: McGraw-Hill. ISBN 0072852607. OCLC 51613969.
- Laitz, Steven G.; Bartlette, Christopher (2010). Graduate Review of Tonal Theory (5th ed.). New York: Oxford University Press. ISBN 978-0-19-537698-2.
- Meeùs, Nicolas (2018). "Übergreifen". Gamut: The Journal of the Music Theory Society of the Mid-Atlantic. 8 (1) 6.
- Miller, Michael (2005). The Complete Idiot's Guide to Music Theory. Penguin. ISBN 9781592574377.
- Piston, Walter (1948). Harmony (revised ed.). Norton & Co.
- Schenker, Heinrich (1910). Kontrapunkt: Erster Halbband: Cantus Firmus und Zweistimmiger Satz. Neue Musikalische Theorien und Phantasien (in German). Vol. II. Vienna: Universal Edition.
- Schenker, Heinrich (1954). Jonas, Oswald (ed.). Harmony. Translated by Borgese, Elisabeth Mann. Chicago: University of Chicago Press. LCCN 51-11213.
- Schenker, Heinrich (1987) [Original German published 1910]. Rothgeb, John (ed.). Counterpoint, Book I: Cantus Firmus and Two-Voice Counterpoint. New Musical Theories and Fantasies. Vol. II. Translated by Rothgeb, John; Thym, Jürgen. New York: Schirmer. ISBN 0-02-873222-7.
- Schoenberg, Arnold (1983) [Original German published 1911]. Theory of Harmony. Translated by Carter, Roy E. Berkeley: University of California Press. ISBN 0-520-04944-6.
- Schonbrun, Marc (2011). The Everything Music Theory Book. Adams Media. ISBN 9781440511820.
- Tanguiane, Andranick S. (1993). Artificial Perception and Music Recognition. Lecture Notes in Artificial Intelligence. Vol. 746. Berlin-Heidelberg: Springer. ISBN 978-3-540-57394-4.
- Tanguiane, Andranick S. (1994). "A Principle of Correlativity of Perception and Its Application to Music Recognition". Music Perception. 11 (4): 465–502. doi:10.2307/40285634. JSTOR 40285634.
- Terefenko, Dariusz (2014). Jazz Theory: From Basic to Advanced Study. Routledge. ISBN 9781135043018.
- Tymoczko, Dmitri (2011). A Geometry of Music: Harmony and Counterpoint in the Extended Common Practice. Oxford Studies in Music Theory. New York: Oxford University Press. ISBN 978-0-19-533667-2.
- Wason, Robert W. (1985). Viennese Harmonic Theory from Albrechtsberger to Schenker and Schoenberg. Studies in Musicology. Ann Arbor, MI: UMI Research Press. ISBN 0-8357-1586-8.
