= Anton Webern =

Austrian composer and conductor (1883–1945)

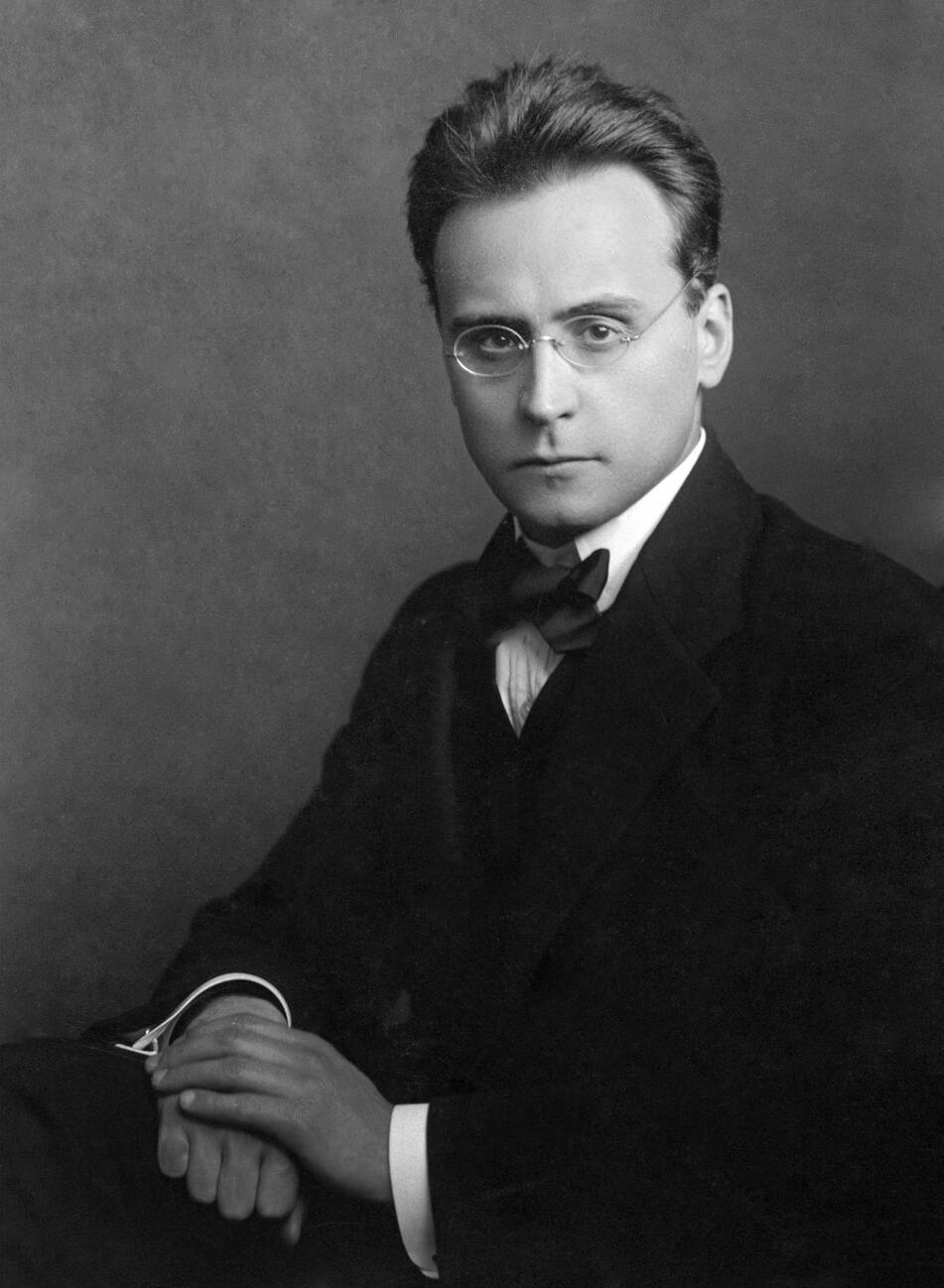
- Webern in Stettin, October 1912
- Born: 3 December 1883; Vienna, Austria-Hungary
- Died: 15 September 1945 (aged 61); Mittersill, Austria
- Occupations: Composer; conductor
- Works: List of compositions

Anton Webern (Note: Anton Friedrich Wilhelm von Webern never used his middle names and often signed his name simply Anton Webern.) (German: [ˈantoːn ˈveːbɐn]; 3 December 1883 – 15 September 1945) was an Austrian composer, conductor, and musicologist whose modernist music was among the most radical of its milieu in its lyrical, poetic concision and use of then novel atonal and twelve-tone techniques. His approach was typically rigorous, inspired by his studies of the Franco-Flemish School under Guido Adler and by Arnold Schoenberg's emphasis on structure in teaching composition from the music of Johann Sebastian Bach, the First Viennese School, and Johannes Brahms. Webern, Schoenberg, and their colleague Alban Berg were at the core of what became known as the Second Viennese School.

Webern was likely the first and certainly the last of the three to write music in an aphoristic and expressionist style, reflecting his instincts and the idiosyncrasy of his compositional process. Working from personal experience, he treated themes of love, nature, mysticism, and nostalgia. Unhappily peripatetic and often assigned light music or operetta in his early conducting career, he aspired to conduct what was seen as more respectable, serious music at home in Vienna. Following Schoenberg's guidance, Webern tried writing music of greater length during and after their World War I service, relying on the structural support of texts in many Lieder.

He rose as a choirmaster and conductor, championing Gustav Mahler's music in Red Vienna and abroad. With Schoenberg based in Berlin, Webern began writing music of increasing confidence, independence, and scale using twelve-tone technique. Marginalized as a "cultural Bolshevist" in Fascist Austria and Nazi Germany, he maintained "the path to the new music", enjoyed international recognition, and relied more on teaching (Note: As teacher, Webern guided and variously influenced Max Deutsch (or Frederick or Friedrich Dorian), Hanns Eisler, Stella Eisner, Arnold Elston, Fré Focke, Karl Amadeus Hartmann, Philip Herschkowitz, Roland Leich, Kurt List, Fritz Mahler, Kurt Manschinger, Gerd Muehsam, Matty Niël, Karl Rankl, George Robert (briefly of the First Piano Quartet), Louis Rognoni, Humphrey Searle, Leopold Spinner, Othmar Steinbauer, Eduard Steuermann, Hans Swarowsky, Stefan Wolpe, Ludwig Zenk (Swarowsky's cousin), and possibly René Leibowitz.) for income. He opposed fascist cultural positions but espoused pan-Germanism and was torn, like friends and family, among uncertainties. His hope for moderate and successful governance of Austria within Nazi Germany proved misplaced, and he helped Jewish friends emigrate and hide while repeatedly considering emigrating himself.

A soldier accidentally killed Webern after World War II. In a phenomenon known as post-Webernism, his music was celebrated by composers, musicians, and scholars. René Leibowitz, Pierre Boulez, Robert Craft, and Hans and Rosaleen Moldenhauer established it as an important part of modernism through performance, study, and advocacy. Igor Stravinsky assimilated it. To many, it represented a path to serialism. Broader understanding of Webern's expressive agenda, performance practice, and complex sociocultural and political context lagged. A historical edition of his music is currently underway.

== Biography ==
=== 1883–1908: Upbringing between late Imperial Vienna and countryside ===
==== Bucolic Heimat ====
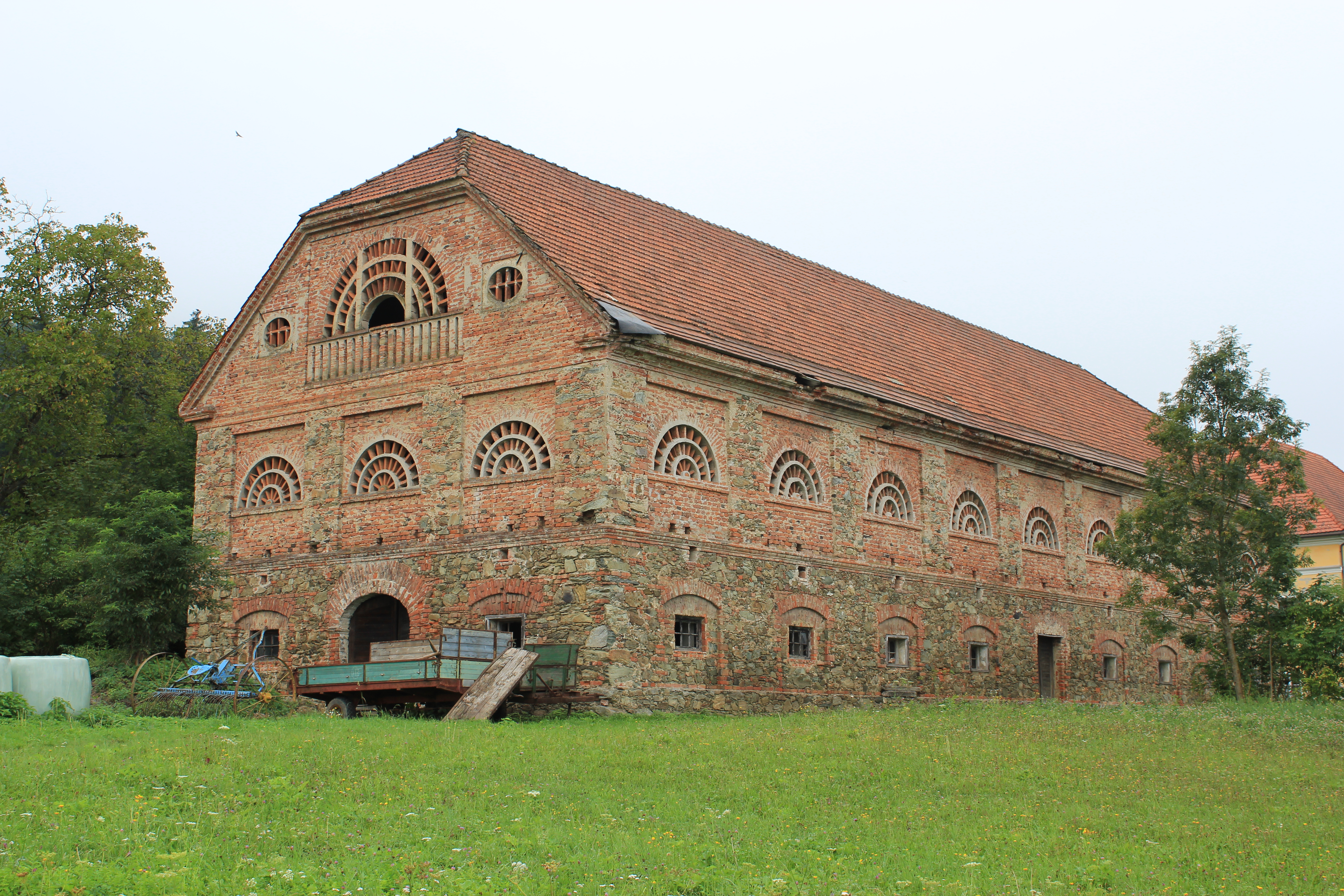
Brick barn in a field of wildflowers on the Preglhof estate

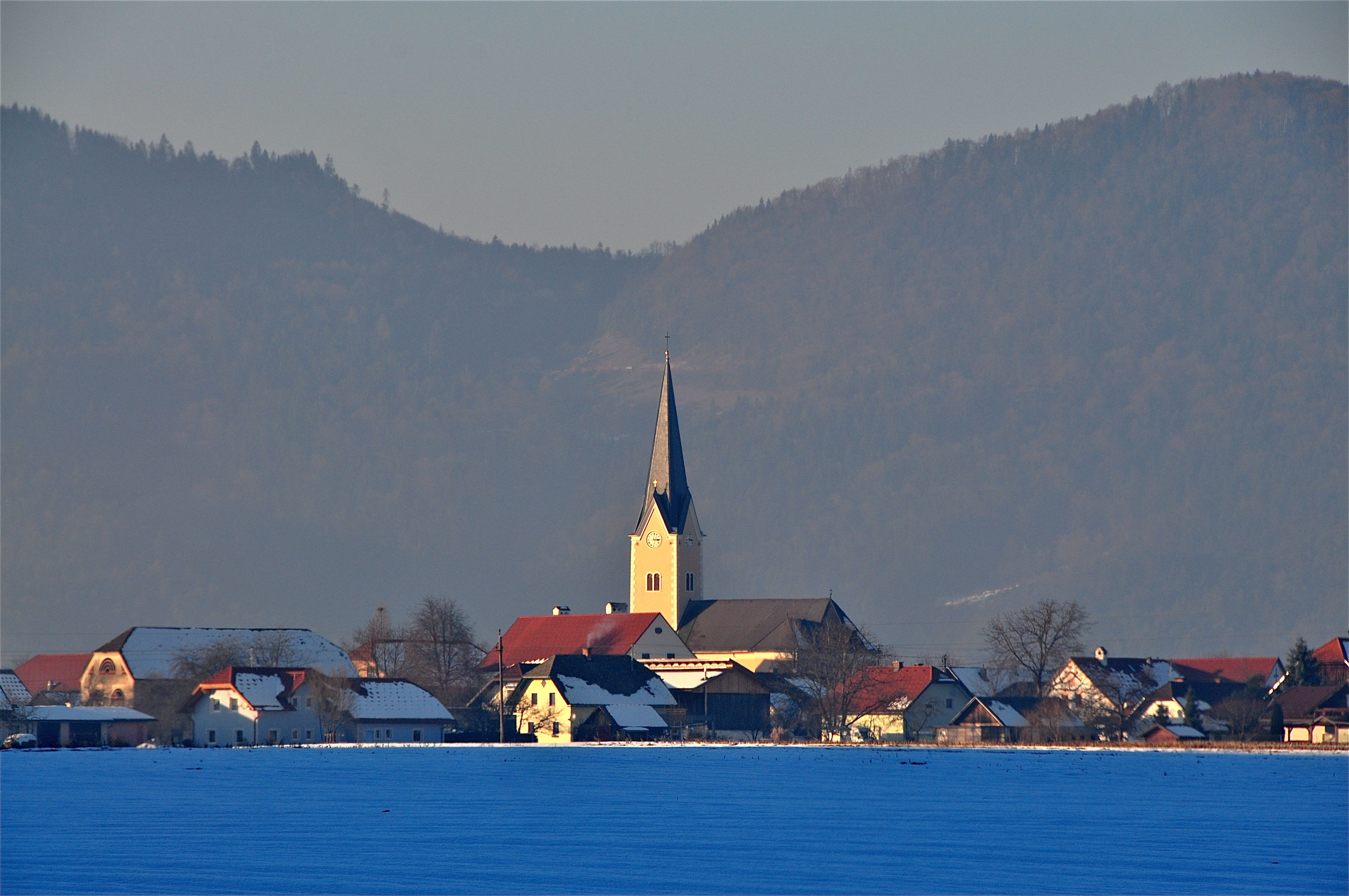
Pfarrkirche Schwabegg and southern foothills across from a snowy field

Anton Webern, of the Webern noble family, was born on 3 December 1883 in Vienna, Austria-Hungary, the only surviving son of Carl von Webern, a decorated army veteran, high-ranking civil servant, and mining engineer who owned the Lamprechtsberg copper mine. He grew up mainly in Graz (1890–1894) and Klagenfurt (1894–1902), with one stay in Olomouc and more in Vienna for his father's work. He excelled only in the humanities and likely sang in choir at school.

He began piano and sang opera with his mother Amalie (née Geer), a trained pianist and accomplished singer, danced with his sisters Rosa and Maria, and received drums, then a trumpet, and later a violin as Christmas gifts. Local musician Edwin Komauer also taught him piano, cello, and likely counterpoint from Bach's music and cello suites. The family played chamber music, including Mozart, Schubert, and Beethoven, and Webern played in local orchestras.

The children spent Easter holidays (Osterferien) and summer vacations (Sommerfrischen) at the Preglhof, the extended family's country estate near Schwabegg in Carinthia. They played in forests under the Koralpe and on a high meadow by the parish church, where cattle grazed pasture under the care of herders. Webern drove horses to a fair in Bleiburg, fought a wildfire, and saved Rosa from drowning in the bathing pond. In winter, they ice-skated the Lendkanal to the Wörthersee. These experiences, and reading Peter Rosegger, an Austrian contributor to the broader Heimatkunst (lit. 'homeland art') movement, shaped his distinct and lasting sense of Heimat (lit. 'homeland').

==== University ====
Before studying at the University of Vienna (1902–1906), Webern immersed himself in concerts, operas, plays, galleries, and cultural history, visiting the Bayreuth Festival, Musikverein, Neue Pinakothek, Prinzregententheater, and Wahnfried. He took counterpoint with Karel Navrátil, harmony with Hermann Graedener, cello with Josef Háša, and piano, in which he was less proficient, with an unidentified Theodor Leschetizky pupil.

While enrolled, he kept attending many performances to learn the standard and emerging repertoire at the Burgtheater, Vienna Court Opera, and other venues, listening to many works by Brahms, Mahler, Schumann, Strauss, Wagner, and Wolf. He encountered singers like Theodor Bertram, Marie Gutheil-Schoder, and Hermann Winkelmann and conductors like Mahler, Strauss, Arthur Nikisch, and Felix Weingartner. He sang under Siegfried Wagner in Bruckner's Te Deum as a Wagner Society member and visited the Munich Kammerspiele for Frank Wedekind's Hidalla.

At school, he analyzed Beethoven's late quartets at the piano with classmate Egon Wellesz, took a Wagner seminar, and learned the historical development of musical styles and techniques mainly from Guido Adler, an acquaintance of Wagner and Liszt, (Note: Liszt, Wagner, and Bruckner were associated with "music of the future".) pupil of Bruckner, (Note: Bruckner told students he was no longer guided by the rules he taught, broadening Adler's normative ideas about music.) and friend of Mahler. For his musicology doctorate under Adler, he edited the Choralis Constantinus II. (Note: Guido Adler asked him to edit the third volume in 1925, but Webern declined due to lack of time and money, instead proposing lectures on instrumentation and "modern music (Strauss, Mahler, Reger, Schoenberg)" taught through "Formenlehre [or] formal principles (musical logic)" and links to "older masters".) As a composer, he would emulate its "subtle organization in the interplay of parts", which he described at length:

The voices proceed ... in [much] equality[, each with] its own development [as] a completely self-contained, separately comprehensible, wonderfully animated structural unit [...]. ... [C]anonic devices [are used] in the greatest profusion [with] the keenest observation of tone colourings in the various registers of the human voice [and] frequent ... interlacing of voices ... by leaps.

He also studied art history and philosophy with Max Dvořák, Laurenz Müllner, and Franz Wickhoff, and joined the Albrecht Dürer Gesellschaft (lit. 'Albrecht Dürer Society') in 1903, later serving on its board. His cousin Ernst Diez, then a University of Graz art history student, may have introduced him to the work of Arnold Böcklin and Giovanni Segantini, which he admired along with that of Ferdinand Hodler and Moritz von Schwind. He prized Segantini's landscapes as highly as Beethoven's music, diarying in 1904:

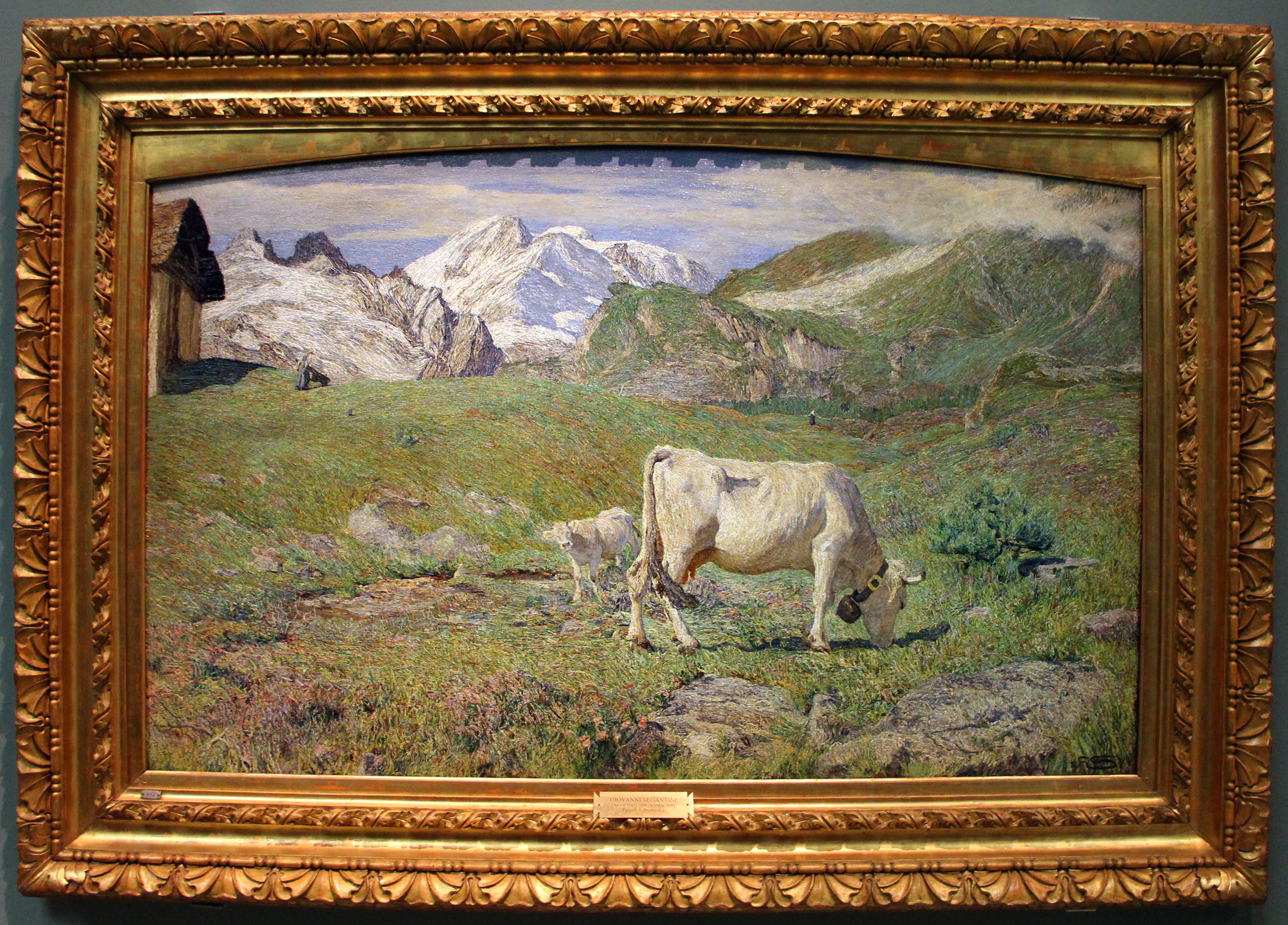
Spring Pastures, 1896, by Giovanni Segantini

I long for an artist in music such as Segantini was in painting ... far away from all turmoil of the world, in contemplation of the glaciers, of eternal ice and snow, of the sombre mountain giants. ... [A]n alpine storm, ... the radiance of the summer sun on flower-covered meadows—all these would have to be in the music, born ... of alpine solitude. That man would then be the Beethoven of our day.

Finally, Webern studied Catholic liturgy and nationalism, shaped by his upbringing. He first found those in his new milieu smug, alien, and distinctly Jewish amid antisemitic reaction to the December Constitution's 1867 Jewish emancipation. By 1902, he had close Jewish friends like fellow student Heinrich Jalowetz, likely altering his views.

==== Schoenberg and his circle ====
Adler pupil Karl Weigl brought Schoenberg's Pelleas und Melisande to class in 1903, riveting Webern, who attended performances of his songs and Verklärte Nacht in 1903–04. In 1904, Webern tried Hans Pfitzner's composition lessons in Berlin but left over attacks on Mahler and R. Strauss. Adler admired and may have recommended Schoenberg, or Webern may have seen his Schwarzwald School newspaper ads before starting lessons in fall 1904, perhaps as his first Vienna pupil.

Thus Webern met Berg as another Schoenberg pupil, and Schoenberg's brother-in-law Alexander Zemlinsky, through whom he may have worked as an assistant coach at the Volksoper in Vienna (1906–1909). Schoenberg, Berg, and Webern became lifelong friends following similar musical paths. Adler, Jalowetz, and Webern played Schoenberg's quartets under the composer, accompanying Gutheil-Schoder in rehearsals for Op. 10.

Also through Schoenberg, who painted and had a 1910 solo exhibition at Hugo Heller's bookstore, Webern met Gustav Klimt, Oskar Kokoschka, Max Oppenheimer (with whom he corresponded on ich–Du terms), Egon Schiele, and Emil Stumpp. In 1920, Webern wrote Berg about the "indescribable impression" Klimt's work made on him, "that of a luminous, tender, heavenly realm". (Note: Webern and others gave Schoenberg Klimt prints for his 1921 birthday.) He also met Karl Kraus, whose lyrics he later set, but only to completion in Op. 13/i ("Wiese im Park").

=== 1908–1918: Early adulthood in Austria-Hungary and German Empire ===
==== Marriage ====
Webern married Wilhelmine "Minna" Mörtl in a 1911 civil ceremony in Danzig. She had become pregnant in 1910 and feared disapproval, as they were cousins. Thus the Catholic Church only solemnized their lasting union in 1915, after three children had been born.

They met in 1902, later hiking along the Kamp from Rosenburg-Mold to Allentsteig in 1905. He wooed her with John Ruskin essays (in German translation), dedicating his Langsamer Satz to her. Webern diaried about their time together "with obvious literary aspirations":

We wandered [...]. The forest symphony resounded. ... A walk in the moonlight on flowery meadows—Then the night—"what the night gave to me, will long make me tremble."—Two souls had wed. (Note: Here Webern quoted Detlev von Liliencron's "Heimgang in der Frühe", which he set to music in 1903.)

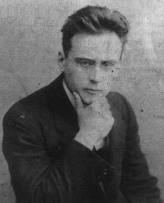
Photograph of Webern (1912)

==== Early conducting career ====
Webern conducted and coached singers and choirs mostly in operetta, musical theater, light music, and some opera in his early career. Operetta was in its Viennese Silver Age. Much of it was regarded as "low-" or "middlebrow"; Kraus, Theodor W. Adorno, and Ernst Krenek found it "uppity" in its pretensions. (Note: Still later, for Carl Dahlhaus, it was "trivial".) In 1924 Ernst Décsey recalled he once found operetta, with its "old laziness and unbearable musical blandness", beneath him. J. P. Hodin contextualized the opposition of the "youthful intelligentsia" to operetta with a quote from Hermann Bahr's 1907 essay Wien:

[E]veryone knows ... it is always Sunday in Vienna ... one lives in a world of half-poetry which is very dangerous for the real thing. They can recognize a few waltzes by Lanner and Strauss ... a few Viennese songs ... It is a well-known fact that Vienna has the finest cakes ... and the most cheerful, friendly people. ... But those who are condemned to live here cannot understand all this.

"What benefit ... if all operettas ... were destroyed", Webern told Diez in 1908. But by 1912, he told Berg that Zeller's Vogelhändler was "quite nice" and Schoenberg that J. Strauss II's Nacht in Venedig was "such fine, delicate music. I now believe ... Strauss is a master." A summer 1908 engagement with Bad Ischl's Kurorchester was "hell". Webern walked out on an engagement in Innsbruck (1909), writing in distress to Schoenberg:

[A] young good-for-nothing ... my 'superior!' ... what do I have to do with such a theatre? ... do I have to perform all this filth? (Note: In 1926, he counseled his pupil Ludwig Zenk, then in an analogous situation, not to resign ("Do not allow yourself to be angered"), citing the examples of Mahler's conflicts with Felix von Kraus over tempi and "How Mahler had to suffer under [Bernhard] Pollini for so many years!")

Webern wrote Zemlinsky seeking work at the Berlin or Vienna Volksoper instead. (Note: Most references to a Volksoper in the Moldenhauers' Chronicle are to the famous one in Vienna, but Webern's father referred to one in Berlin.) He started at Bad Teplitz's Civic Theater in early 1910, where the local news reported his "sensitive, devoted guidance" as conductor of Fall's Geschiedene Frau, but he quit within months due to disagreements. His repertoire likely included Fall's Dollarprinzessin, Lehár's Graf von Luxemburg, O. Straus's Walzertraum, J. Strauss II's Fledermaus, and Schumann's Manfred. There were only 22 musicians in the orchestra, too few to perform Puccini's operas, he noted.

Webern then summered at the Preglhof, composing his Op. 7 and planning an opera. In September, he attended the Munich premiere of Mahler's Symphony of a Thousand and visited with his idol, (Note: Webern was "effusive and ecstatic" in his veneration of Mahler.) who gave Webern a sketch of "Lob der Kritik". (Note: This "Praise of Criticism" was an early version of "Lob des hohen Verstandes" ("Praise of Lofty Intellect") from Des Knaben Wunderhorn.) Webern then worked with Jalowetz as assistant conductor in Danzig (1910–1911), where he first saw the "almost frightening" ocean. He conducted von Flotow's Wintermärchen, George's Försterchristl, Jones' Geisha, Lehár's Lustige Witwe, Lortzing's Waffenschmied, Offenbach's Belle Hélène, and J. Strauss II's Zigeunerbaron. He particularly enjoyed Offenbach's Contes d'Hoffmann and Rossini's Barbiere di Siviglia, but only Jalowetz was allowed to conduct this more established repertoire.

Webern soon expressed homesickness to Berg; he could not bear the separation from Schoenberg and their world in Vienna. He returned after resigning in spring 1911, and they attended Mahler's funeral in May 1911. Then in summer 1911, a neighbor's antisemitic abuse and aggression caused Schoenberg to quit work, abandon Vienna, and go with his family to stay with Zemlinsky on Lake Starnberg. Webern and others fundraised for Schoenberg's return, circulating more than one hundred leaflets with forty-eight signatories, including G. Adler, H. Bahr, Klimt, Kraus, and R. Strauss, among others. (Note: Other prominent signatories included Peter Altenberg, Julius Bittner, Artur Bodanzky, Engelbert Humperdinck, Wilhelm Kienzl, Julius Korngold, Adolf Loos, Arthur Schnitzler, Franz Schreker, and Bruno Walter.) But Schoenberg was resolved to move to Berlin, and not for the first or last time, convinced of Vienna's fundamental hostility.

Webern soon joined him (1910–1912), finishing no new music in his devoted work on Schoenberg's behalf, which entailed many editing and writing projects. He gradually became tired, unhappy, and homesick. He tried to persuade Schoenberg to return home to Vienna, continuing the fundraising campaign and lobbying for a position there for Schoenberg, but Schoenberg could not bear to return to the Akademie für Musik und darstellende Kunst due to his prior experiences in Vienna. At the same time, Webern began a cycle of repeatedly quitting and being rehired by Zemlinsky at the Deutsches Landestheater in Prague (1911–1918).

He had a short-lived conducting post in Stettin (1912–1913), which, as all the others, kept him from composing and alienated him. On the verge of a breakdown, he wrote Berg shortly after arriving (July 1912):

I find myself under the dregs of mankind ... with ... absurd music; I'm ... seriously ill. My nerves torture me [...]. I want to be far away [...]. In the mountains. There everything is clear, the water, the air, the earth. Here everything is dismal. I'm poisoned by drinking the water.

==== "Old song" of "lost paradise" ====
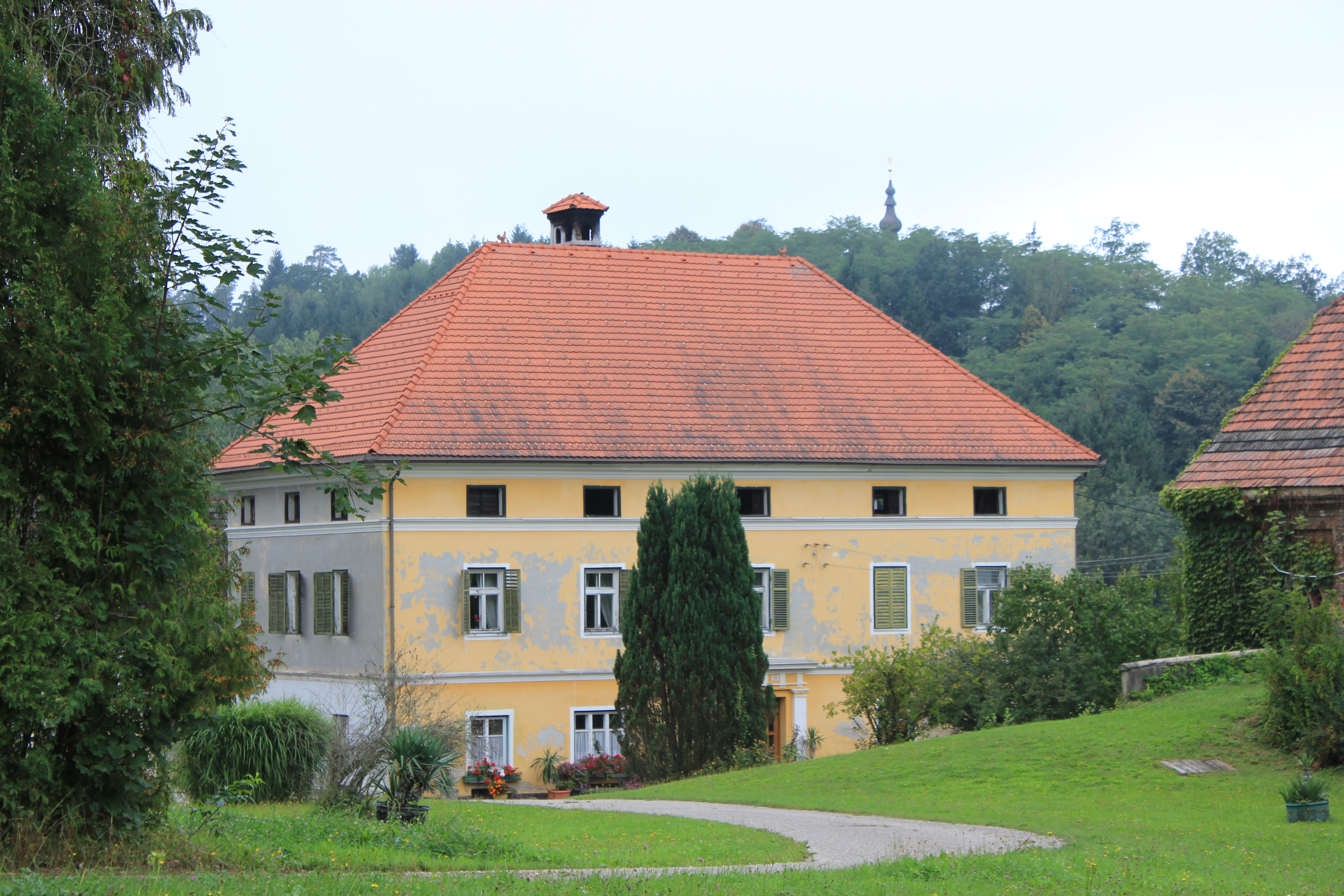
Schloss Preglhof, Webern's childhood home, in Oberdorf

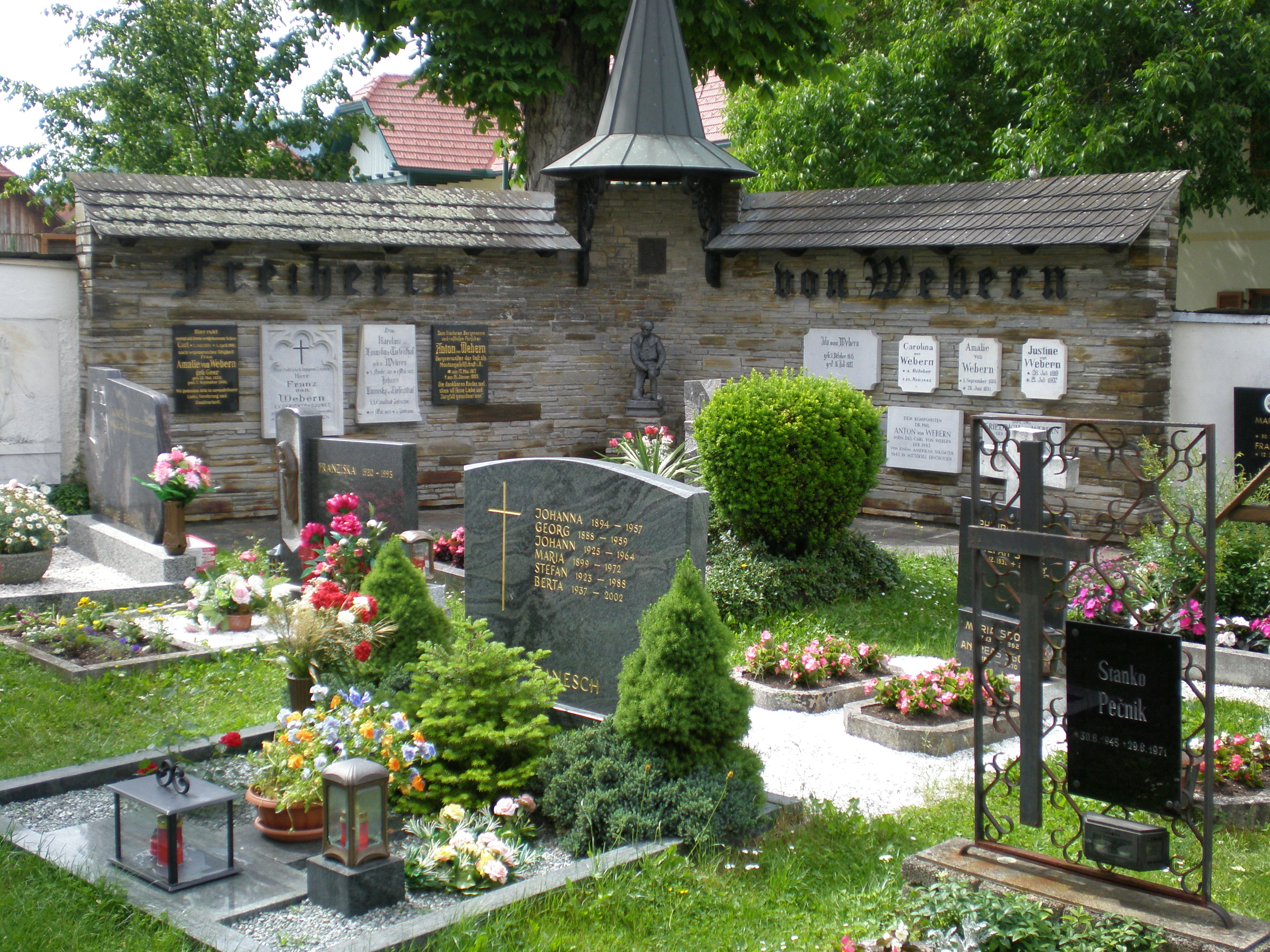
Webern family grave in Schwabegg, on a meander spur of the Drava

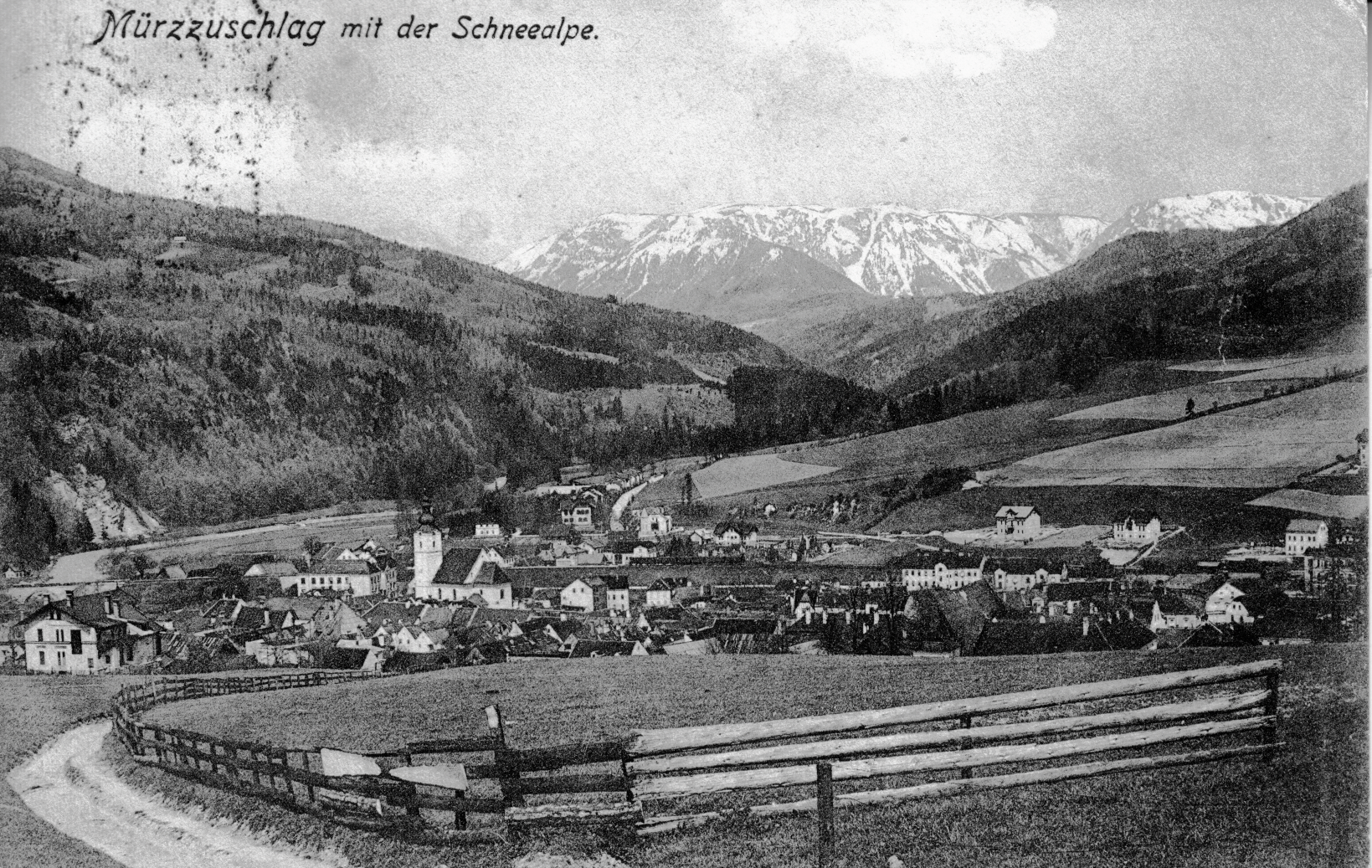
Mürzzuschlag, 1908 postcard photo

Webern's father sold the Preglhof in 1912, and Webern mourned it as a "lost paradise". He revisited it and the family grave in nearby Schwabegg his entire life, associating both with the memory of his mother, whose 1906 death profoundly affected him. In letters to Schoenberg, he recalled the countryside, forests, garden, cemetery, and his daily walks to her grave with intense longing, describing their enduring emotional warmth. (Note: July 1912: "I am overwhelmed with emotion when I imagine everything [...]. My daily way to the grave of my mother. The infinite mildness of the entire countryside, all the thousand things there. Now everything is over. ... If only you could ... have seen [...]. The seclusion, the quiet, the house, the forests, the garden, and the cemetery. About this time, I had always composed diligently." September 1912, following the anniversary of her loss: "When I read letters from my mother, I could die of longing for the places where all these things have occurred. How far back and ... beautiful. ... Often a ... soft ... radiance, a supernatural warmth falls upon me— ... from my mother.")

Webern sought spiritual and personal connection with the past in the surrounding Alps, whose landscapes he associated with memories of his mother and lost childhood homeland (Heimat). This nexus of nature, memory, and spirituality recurs throughout his diaries, letter, and music, appearing explicitly in sketches and, at times, in texts and programs. Summering in resort towns like Mürzzuschlag and sometimes summitting the Gaisstein, Grossglockner, Hochschober, Hochschwab, and Schneealpe, among others, he was fascinated by the alpine climate and föhn, glaciers, pine trees, and springs "crystal clear down to the bottom". He treasured this time "up there, in the heights", where "one should stay".

For Christmas in 1912, Webern gave Schoenberg a copy of Rosegger's Waldheimat (Forest Homeland), with its passages on nostalgia for childhood paradise:

Childhood days and childhood home! It is that old song of Paradise. There are people for whom ... Paradise is never lost ... in them God's kingdom ... rises ... more ... in ... memory than ... ever ... in reality; ... children are poets and retrace their steps.

Rosegger's account of his mother's death at the book's end ("An meine Mutter") resonated with Webern, who connected it to his Six Orchestral Pieces, Op. 6. In a January 1913 letter to Schoenberg, Webern revealed that these pieces were programmatic reflections on experiences associated with his mother's death. Writing Berg in July 1912, he linked several other works to her death as well, including his early songs and Passacaglia, the Five Movements for String Quartet, and the Five Orchestral Pieces, Op. 10.

Webern also collected and pressed alpine herbs and cemetery flowers, and cultivated gardens throughout his life (first at his father's home in Klagenfurt, and later at his own homes in Mödling and then Maria Enzersdorf). Inspired by Goethe's Metamorphosis of Plants, he treated gardening like composition: a disciplined way of engaging with nature. Gardens, like cemeteries, were enclosed spaces of renewal, memory, and contemplation. These concerns endured throughout his life and music: in 1933, he spoke of sensing "Pan" in a meadow (a sentiment likely by way of Mahler's Third); and in 1934, he described his work as transforming the past into childhood memory.

==== Psychotherapy ====
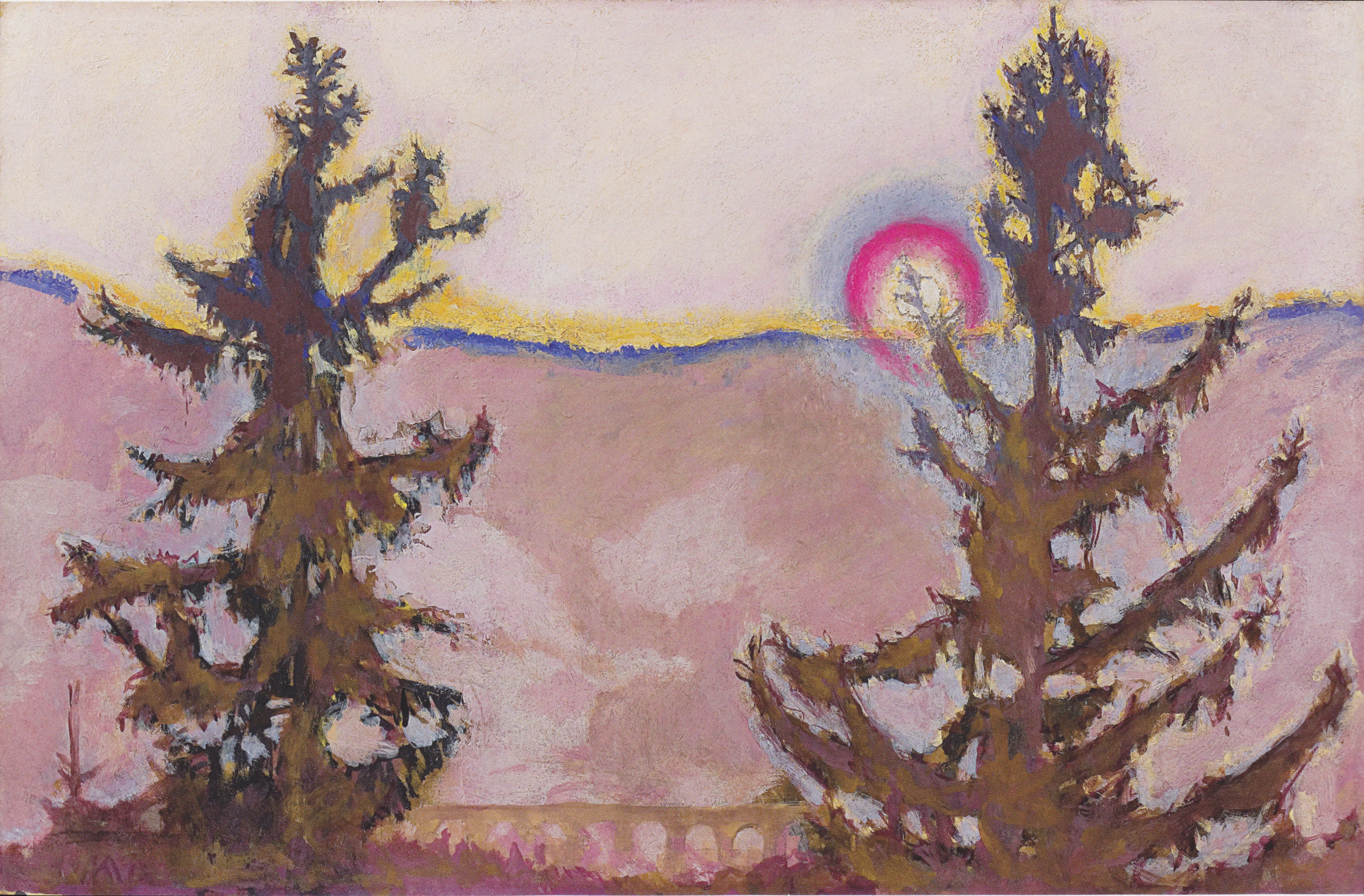
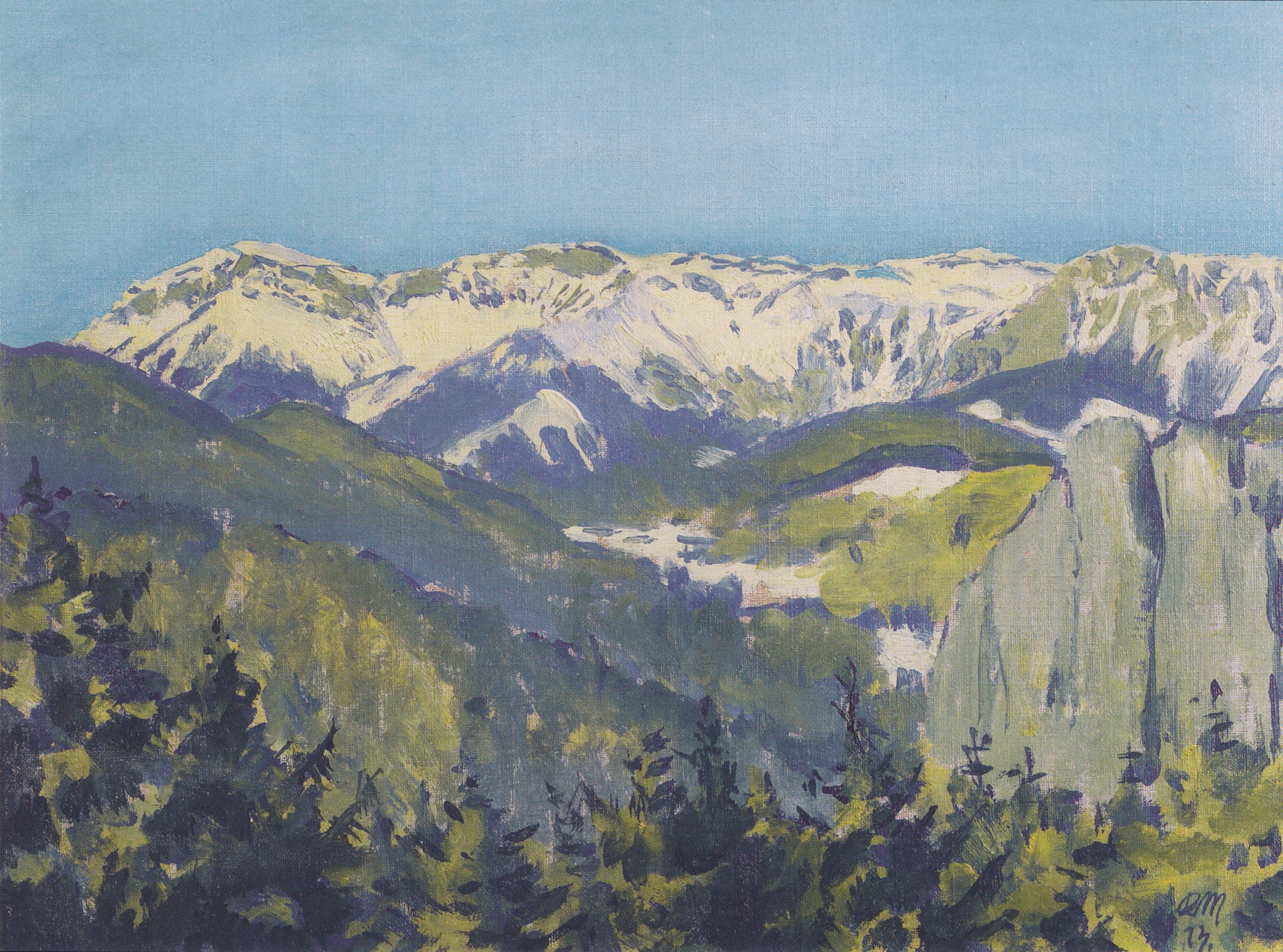
Semmering, twice depicted in 1913 by Koloman Moser

In 1912–1913, Webern had a breakdown and saw physician Alfred Adler, who noted his idealism and perfectionism. There were many factors involved. Webern had little time (mostly summers) to compose. There were conflicts at work (e.g., he emphasized that a director called him a "little man"). His ambivalence toward sales-oriented popular music theater contributed ("I ... stir the sauce", he wrote). "It appears ... improbable that I should remain with the theatre. It is ... terrible. ... I can hardly ... adjust to being away from home", he had written Schoenberg in 1910. Miserably ill and alienated, he first had sought medical advice and taken rest at a popular sanatorium resort in Semmering. Adler later evaluated his symptoms as psychogenic responses to unmet expectations. Webern wrote Schoenberg that Adler's psychoanalysis was helpful and insightful.

==== World War I ====
As World War I broke out and nationalist fervor swept Europe, Webern found it "inconceivable", he wrote Schoenberg in August 1914, "that the German Reich, and we along with it, should perish." Yielding in his distrust of Protestant Germany, he compared Catholic France to "cannibals" and expressed pan-German patriotism amid wartime propaganda. He cited his "faith in the German spirit" as having "created, almost exclusively, the culture of mankind". Despite his high regard of French classical music, especially Debussy's, Webern revered the tradition as centered on counterpoint and form, and as mainly German since Bach.

Webern served intermittently for nearly two years. The war cost him professional opportunities, much of his social life, and the necessary leisure time to compose (he completed only nine Lieder). Moving frequently and tiring, he began to despair, explaining to Schoenberg in November 1916 that the reality of war was "Old Testament" and "'Eye for eye'", "as if Christ had never existed". Webern was discharged in December 1916 for myopia, which had disqualified him from frontline service.

"Fahr hin, o Seel', zu deinem Gott", double canon in motu contrario (Klagenfurt, 20 July 1917) – soprano Halina Lukomska and conductor Pierre Boulez
In this excerpt (mm. 20–29) is Webern's lyric setting of the text "[Gott ... nehme dich] barmherzig auf in jenes bess're Leben" (God ... lifts you mercifully into that better life). Julian Johnson noted Webern's use of first short, then long note values and phrases to impart a sense of calm rest before the final high harp harmonic, a tone painting of heaven.

In 1917, amid the aftermath of World War I, he reflected on his patriotism and processed his sorrow in Lieder. He treated the loss of life and, with the 1916 death of Franz Joseph I of Austria, the end of an era. In "Fahr hin, o Seel'", he selected a lament sung at a funeral in a Rosegger novel. In "Wiese im Park", he selected a text from Kraus recognizing that the day was "dead", "und alles ... so alt" ("and everything ... so old"). Webern also set several disturbing poems by Georg Trakl, some of which are unfinished, having first read his work in Der Brenner magazine or perhaps Kraus's promotion of it in his magazine, Die Fackel. (Note: As members of Vienna's Akademischer Verband für Literatur und Musik (Academic Association for Literature and Music), they likely never met, but Trakl may have seen Webern's Op. 7 in the Association's journal, Der Ruf, and he defended the Second Viennese School after the Skandalkonzert.) With uninterrupted contrapuntal density, by turns muscular and murmured, Webern word painted Trakl's "great cities" and "dying peoples", "violent alarm" and "leafless trees", and "falling stars" in setting "Abendland III".

==== Austrian defeat and socioeconomic strain ====
During and after the end of the war, Webern, like other Austrians, contended with food shortages, insufficient heating, socioeconomic volatility, and geopolitical disaster in defeat. Since 1917, he had considered retreating to the countryside and purchasing a farm as an asset better than war bonds at shielding his family's wealth from inflation. He even proposed to Schoenberg that they might be smallholders together. (In the end, he lost all that remained of his family's wealth to the Austrian hyperinflation by 1924.)

Despite Schoenberg's and his father's advice that he not quit conducting, Webern followed to Schoenberg to Mödling in early 1918, hoping to be reunited with his mentor and to compose more. But Webern's finances were so poor that he soon explored a "voluntary exile" to Prague again. Nonetheless, he continued to raise funds, including his own, for Schoenberg, with whom he spent every day.

Yet soon after he arrived, Webern broke his friendship with Schoenberg. (Note: Berg himself experienced breaks in his friendship with Schoenberg, who could be overbearing. When Webern broke his friendship with Berg (1915–1916), he cited Schoenberg's influence in the matter.) The break was multifactorial but involved Webern's dissatisfaction with his career and financial turmoil. Berg learned of the Weberns' ill temperaments and "latent antisemitism" from Schoenberg, (Note: Schoenberg's son-in-law Felix Greissle also recalled Webern's labile antisemitism, contextualizing it as part of Webern's vacillating resentment and respect toward Schoenberg while also noting that Schoenberg had internalized some antisemitism ("mildly" antisemitic jokes were common in Schoenberg's home, Greissle's son George recalled, which Julie Brown contextualized as "unexceptional"). Schoenberg was self-conscious of his Jewish and class background, having confronted antisemitism in reading Otto Weininger. He repeatedly engaged with controversies surrounding Richard Wagner, who he also read and whose possible Jewish lineage interested him. He contended with Wagnerian charges as to Jewish artists' creative inabilities. While working on Die Jakobsleiter on family holiday at Mattsee in summer 1921, Schoenberg was given notice that all Jews should leave the town, angering him and sparking his return from Protestantism to Judaism. In response, Wassily Kandinsky wrote to him from the Bauhaus in 1923, "I reject you as a Jew. ... Better to be a human being". Schoenberg responded, "what is anti-Semitism to lead to if not to acts of violence?") and noted that Schoenberg "wouldn't explain" further than "'Webern wants to go to Prague again'". Bailey Puffett argued that Webern's actions in and after the 1930s suggested that he was not antisemitic, at least in his maturity. She noted that Webern later wrote Schoenberg that he felt "a sense of the most vehement aversion" against German-speaking people who were.

After meeting with Webern, Berg saw "the matter in a different light", considering Webern "by and large innocent" in light of what Webern said was Schoenberg's "kick in the teeth": after laying plans for a New Music society, Schoenberg angrily called Webern "secretive and deceitful" upon learning that Webern was instead considering Prague again. They reconciled in October 1918, not long before Webern's father died in 1919. Webern was changed by these events; he slowly began to grow more independent of Schoenberg, who was like a father to him. For his part, Schoenberg was not infrequently dubious of Webern, whom he still considered his closest friend. (Note: In and after the 1930s, Schoenberg worried that adherents to Aryanism would deny his standing as the originator of twelve-tone technique, writing that Webern might "someday use his chance ... of the Aryan against the Jew" and that "[Josef Matthias] Hauer ... does the same".)

=== 1918–1933: Rise in Interwar Vienna ===
==== Society for Private Musical Performances ====
Webern stayed in Vienna and worked with Berg, Schoenberg, and Erwin Stein at the Society for Private Musical Performances (1918–1921). They promoted new music through music competitions and performances sharing the music of Bartók, Berg, Busoni, Korngold, Mahler, Novák, Reger, Satie, Strauss, and Debussy (who once wished for a "Society of Musical Esotericism"), among others.

Webern wrote Berg about Stravinsky's "indescribably touching" Berceuses du chat and "glorious" Pribaoutki, which Schoenberg conducted at a sold-out 1919 Society concert. In 1920, at a Society concert dedicated to Maurice Ravel, he met the composer, whose Mallarmé songs he loved (especially the last). There was likely some degree of reciprocal influence among these composers. Amid worsening inflation in Red Vienna, he feared the Habsburg monarchy's restoration, warning his cousin against a Hofburg apartment in 1920.

For a 1921 "waltz evening" fundraiser, Webern arranged J. Strauss II's Schatz-Walzer (Treasure Waltz) for salon orchestra (string quartet, piano, and harmonium). He made other Society arrangements (some now missing), including of his Passacaglia, Op. 1 (two pianos, six hands); Six Pieces, Op. 6 and Five Pieces, Op. 10 (chamber ensemble); and Schoenberg's Chamber Symphony No. 1, Die glückliche Hand (The Lucky Hand), and Four Orchestral Songs. The Society dissolved amid hyperinflation that year, having boasted some 320 members and sponsored more than a hundred concerts.

==== Mature conducting career in Red Vienna ====
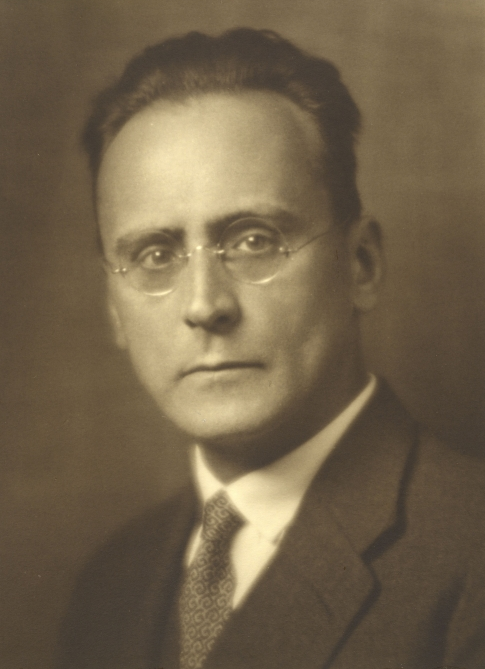
Webern, 1927, portrait by Georg Fayer

On Schoenberg's recommendation, Webern saved the 1920 Gurre-Lieder (Songs of Gurre) performance by the Wiener Schubertbund (Vienna Schubert Society) from failure and became their music director in 1921, conducting Brahms, Mahler, Reger, and Schumann. Citing low salary, mandatory concert tours, and resistance to long rehearsals, he left in 1922. He also directed the Mödling Men's Singing Society (Männergesangverein, 1922–1926), leaving in controversy after hiring Jewish soprano Greta Wilheim for Schubert's Mirjams Siegesgesang (Miriam's Song of Triumph).

He won repute with a 1922 Workers' Symphony (Arbeiter-Sinfonie) performance of Mahler's Third, prompting Berg to hail him as "the greatest conductor since Mahler himself". (Note: Berthold Goldschmidt cautioned that the Second Viennese School were a "mutual admiration society".) It earned him the trust of Social Democratic Arts Council (Sozialdemokratische Kunststelle) Director David Josef Bach, with whom he co-founded and -led the Arts Council's amateur Singing Society (Singverein, from 1923). In 1924, he made arrangements of Liszt's Workers' Chorus (Arbeiterchor, c. 1848 or earlier; shelved amid the Revolutions of 1848), with its message of solidarity, including for bass solo, mixed chorus, and orchestra. The Wiener Zeitung (Vienna Times) touted its March 1925 premiere under his baton, and he then regularly led the Workers' Symphony Concerts.

His Mahler interpretations continued to be lauded, (Note: Since 1902, Webern idolized Mahler, studying his conducting and viewing him as a "serious" and "introspective" if sometimes sentimental composer—perhaps his favorite alongside Beethoven and Schoenberg. Mahler's music resonated with Webern as confiding "inner experiences", from an early "worship of nature" to a more abstract spirituality later. In 1911, Webern aimed to convince his father of his conducting aspirations by taking him to back-to-back performances of Mahler's Symphony of a Thousand. In 1912, he wrote Berg that he "must conduct ... must perform Schoenberg and Mahler and everything that is sacred".) and from 1927, Austria's main radio network RAVAG (Radio-Verkehrs-Aktiengesellschaft) aired twenty-two of his performances. He premiered Berg's Chamber Concerto with Rudolf Kolisch and Eduard Steuermann in 1927 and led Stravinsky's Les Noces with Erich Leinsdorf in 1933. (Note: Leinsdorf, on piano, considered the experience of "utmost value to my musical and critical development". The popevki-like 3-7A cell and 4–10 variant of Les Noces are not altogether unlike the rhythmized trichords of Webern's later Op. 24 or the tetrachords of Op. 30 (which Stravinsky later admired), apart from Stravinsky's tendency to anhemitony in marked contrast to Webern's hemitonicism.) He also led Brahms's German Requiem in 1931, followed by Berg's Der Wein, Mahler's Second, and Schoenberg's Friede auf Erden in 1932. Oscar Pollak for Der Kampf (The Struggle) slammed Webern's programming as ambitious and bourgeois in 1929, and Armand Machabey called him a meticulous conductor of contemporary music comparable to Willem Mengelberg in 1930.

Webern generally avoided politics and seemed uneasy relying on the Social Democratic Party for conducting work, perhaps on religious grounds, though he aligned with their cultural and educational objectives, and saw his roles with the working class as a Christian duty (after they performed Bruckner's Mass No. 3, a singer carved him a music stand inscribed "Art is service to God"). He was addressed as "Doctor", not "comrade", though he used the term to address others in the movement and served on administrative committees. He remembered his family's minor-noble heritage, which old friends respected by using his nobiliary particle "von" long after the 1919 social-democratic nobility abolition law, and reclaimed his nobiliary particle in the 1930s.

==== Relative success in a destabilizing society ====
Webern's finances were often precarious, even in his years of relative success. Relief came from family, friends, patrons, and prizes. He twice received the Preis der Stadt Wien für Musik. (Note: The first 1924 prize, juried by Julius Bittner, Joseph Marx, and Richard Strauss, was shared by several, including Berg, Carl Prohaska, Franz Schmidt, Max Springer, and Karl Weigl; the note was signed by Karl Seitz, who asked Webern at a concert two weeks prior, "Are you a professional musician?" Berg and Webern later served as jurists. Only Webern received the prize in 1931.) To compose more, he sought income while trying not to overcommit himself as a conductor. He was not very ambitious or astute in business and contracted with Universal Edition (U.E.) only after 1919, reaching better terms in 1927. Even with a doctorate and Guido Adler's respect, he never secured a remunerative university position, whereas in 1925 Schoenberg was invited to the Prussian Academy of Arts, ending their seven years together in Mödling.

Social Democrat–Christian Social relations polarized and radicalized amid the Schattendorfer Urteil. Webern and others (Note: Among these lwere Alfred Adler, Karl Bühler, Leo Delitz, Josef Dobrowsky, Sigmund Freud, Ernst Lichtblau, Fanina Halle, Hans Kelsen, Alma Mahler, suffragist Daisy Minor, Robert Musil, Egon Wellesz, and Franz Werfel.) signed an "Announcement of Intellectual Vienna" (Note: "Die Kundgebung des geistigen Wien", April 20, 1927; it read in part, with emphasis in original: "The essence of Spirit [Geist] is above all Freedom, which is now endangered and we feel obligated to protect it. The struggle for a higher humanity and the battle against indolence [Trägheit] and sclerosis [Verödung] will always find us ready. Today, it also finds us prepared for battle.") published days before the 1927 Austrian legislative election on the front page of the Social Democrats' daily newspaper, the Arbeiter-Zeitung (Workers' Times). On Election Day in Die Reichspost, Ignaz Seipel of the Einheitsliste officially applied the term "Red Vienna" pejoratively, attacking Vienna's educational and cultural institutions. Social unrest escalated to the July Revolt of 1927 and beyond. Webern's nostalgia for social order intensified with increasing civil disorder.

In 1928, friends fundraised for him, partly to fund a rest cure at the Kurhaus Semmering for his exhaustion and (possibly psychosomatic) gastrointestinal complaints. (Note: Supporters included D. Bach, Ruzena Herlinger, Werner Reinhart, Elizabeth Sprague Coolidge, Paul Stefan, and the IGNM-Sektion Österreich.) That year, Berg celebrated the "lasting works" and successes of composers "whose point of departure was ... late Mahler, Reger, and Debussy and whose temporary end point is in ... Schoenberg" in their rise from "pitiful 'cliques'" to a large, diverse, international, and "irresistible movement". But with few exceptions they were soon marginalized and ostracized in Central Europe, (Note: Before his suicide in 1942, Stefan Zweig wrote, "the short decade between 1924 and 1933, from the end of German inflation to Hitler's seizure of power, represents—in spite of all—an intermission in the catastrophic sequence of events whose witnesses and victims our generation has been since 1914.") and in 1929 Webern wrote Schoenberg that "it is getting worse and worse here". He declined a RAVAG executive role that year, citing time constraints and fearing further affiliation the Social Democrats.

His music was performed more widely starting in the latter half of the 1920s, but he found no great success as Berg enjoyed with Wozzeck nor as Schoenberg did, to a lesser extent, with Pierrot lunaire or in time with Verklärte Nacht. His Symphony, Op. 21 was performed as a chamber piece in New York by the League of Composers (1929) and separately in London at the 1931 International Society for Contemporary Music (ISCM) Festival. Violinist Louis Krasner said he sensed some resentment, as Webern had "very little". Krenek's impression was that Webern resented his financial hardships and lack of wider recognition.

=== 1933–1938: Perseverance in Schwarzes Wien (Austrofascist Vienna) ===
==== Marginalization at home ====
Financial crises, complex social and political movements, pervasive antisemitism, culture wars, and renewed military conflicts (Note: These conflicts arose within the ideological and political context of Germany–Soviet Union relations, 1918–1941.) continued to shape Webern's world, profoundly circumscribing his life. Shortly after Webern conducted the Brecht–Eisler Solidaritätslied in 1933, Engelbert Dollfuss saw the Kriegswirtschaftliches Ermächtigungsgesetz passed, and choir singers' homes were raided. In the 1934 Austrian Civil War, Austrofascists (Note: The clericofascist Vaterländische Front appealed to Austria's religious and national identity, and its imperial history, to attempt independence of Nazi Germany in alliance with Fascist Italy.) executed, exiled, and imprisoned Social Democrats, outlawed their party, and abolished cultural institutions.

Stigmatized by his decade-long association with Social Democrats, Webern lost a promising domestic conducting career, which might have been better recorded. He eventually abandoned efforts with what remained of the workers' choir in the form of the much constrained Freie Typographia in 1935, instead working as a U.E. editor and IGNM-Sektion Österreich board member and president (1933–1938, 1945).

By the late 1920s, antisemitism had become epidemic, and the socioculturally mixed milieu of Vienna's modern arts and entertainment, including the music of Webern, Schoenberg, Berg, and Mahler, was mocked as foreign and Jewish in a racialized sense, contrasting with what was touted as truly German (and typically conservative, traditional, or rural). (Note: Conversely, popular selections (e.g., Mahler's Lieder eines fahrenden Gesellen) were selectively Aryanized when convenient. "I will determine who is a Jew" effectively became policy.) Webern's admission to the Prussian Academy of Arts was withdrawn as Adolf Hitler rose in Germany, and an Austrian Gauleiter labeled Berg and Webern "Jewish" on Bayerischer Rundfunk in 1933. (Note: Berg wrote Adorno of prior instances, and the Reichskulturkammer called him an "émigré musical Jew" in Die Musik (after Erich Kleiber's 1935 Berlin premiere of the Lulu Suite). Conversely, when in 1933 Berg asked Edward Dent for help finding an academic post to facilitate Adorno's immigration to England, Dent refused, not only citing protectionism and underfunding, but also dubbing them "Hitlerian": "You [note in Berg's hand: '(The Jews?)'] are indeed Hitlerians, as you consider Germany, Austria, Switzerland, Holland, Scandinavia, Czechoslovakia and perhaps even England as belonging to 'Germany'!!!") In the late 1930s, theirs was exhibited as "Entartete Musik" in Nazi Germany (Note: At the Reichsmusiktage, Webern's photo bore Hans Severus Ziegler's caption: "this 'master student' of Arnold Schoenberg outdoes his training even in the length of his nose." Schoenberg, Ziegler said, created atonality by subverting the fundamental German musical principle of the triad. A non-musician, Ziegler relied on shallow polemics to instruct youth. The Nazis practiced an incoherent populism that at times spared jazz and some modernist music.) and later at the Vienna Künstlerhaus in Nazi Austria.

Webern delivered an eight-lecture series The Path to the New Music (Der Weg zur Neuen Musik) (Note: Its transcript went unpublished until 1960 to avoid "expos[ing] Webern to serious consequences".) at Rita Kurzmann-Leuchter's and her physician husband Rudolf Kurzman's home (February–April 1933). He attacked fascist cultural policy, asking "What will come of our struggle?" He observed that "'cultural Bolshevism' is the name given to everything that is going on around Schoenberg, Berg, and myself (Krenek too)" (Note: From 1928 onward, Webern grew closer to Krenek, alongside whom he lectured, whose music (taking a twelve-tone turn) he conducted, and with whom he, Berg, and Adorno shared concerns about the future.) and warned, "Imagine what will be destroyed, wiped out, by this hate of culture!" He lectured more at the Kurzmann-Leuchter home, privately in 1934–1935 on Beethoven's piano sonatas to about 40 attendees and later in 1937–1938.

Persevering, Webern wrote Krenek that "art has its own laws ... if one wants to achieve something in it, only these laws and nothing else can have validity"; (Note: He was responding to Krenek's essay "Freiheit und Verantwortung" ("Freedom and Responsibility") in Willi Reich's 23 – Eine Wiener Musikzeitschrift (1934). Elsewhere Krenek advocated for "a Catholic Austrian avante garde", opposing "the Austrian provincialism that National Socialism wants to force on us." German Wikisource has original text related to this article: 23 – Eine Wiener Musikzeitschrift.) upon completing Op. 26 (1935), he wrote D. Bach, "I hope it is so good that (if people ever get to know it) they will declare me ready for a concentration camp or an insane asylum!" The Vienna Philharmonic nearly refused to play Berg's Violin Concerto in 1936. (Note: Only guest conductor Otto Klemperer's status sufficed to overcome their refusal, and even then, the entire orchestra abruptly walked off stage afterward, leaving Krasner, Klemperer, and Arnold Rosé to stand alone. Rosé, retired, had returned to pay his respects to the late Berg as honorary concertmaster.) Peter Stadlen's 1937 Op. 27 premieres were the last Viennese Webern performances until after World War II. The critical success of Hermann Scherchen's 1938 ISCM London Op. 26 premiere encouraged Webern to write more cantatas and reassured him after a cellist quit Op. 20 mid-performance, declaring it unplayable.

==== Besieged milieu and political uncertainty ====
Webern's milieu comprised increasingly vast differences. He and his family were Catholic, like most Austrians, but not church regulars. Webern was perhaps devout, if unorthodox. They became politically divided. (Note: Webern's only son Peter was an avid Austrian National Socialist. His eldest daughter Amalie married businessman Gunter Waller, who joined the Nazi Party as a business formality. His youngest daughter Christine married Kreisleiter and Schutzstaffel member Benno Mattel (sometimes Mattl), "little liked by the family", in June 1938. His middle daughter Maria Halbich almost emigrated with a man of Jewish family background. She and Webern's wife Wilhelmine "Minna" Mörtl were wary of Hitler and the Nazis. Webern avoided politics at home.) His friends (e.g., then Zionist Schoenberg, (Note: Webern told Krasner, "Schoenberg, had he not been a Jew, would have been quite different!" For Bailey Puffett, this likely referred to Schoenberg's politics, which were vaguely conservative and German nationalist before becoming Zionist. See also "My Attitude towards Politics" in Schoenberg's Style and Idea.) left-leaning Berg) had belonged to a mostly Jewish milieu from late Imperial to "red" (Social Democratic) Vienna. Alma Mahler, Krenek, Willi Reich, and Stein began to favor the Fatherland Front or aligned with Italian fascism as lesser evils to Nazism.

Webern was politically naive, easily swayed by family and friends, and uncertain how to resolve Austria's problems. He tried to mediate among competing viewpoints with optimistic or self-soothing complacency (and later, perhaps, growing cognitive dissonance), presuming power would moderate Hitler to the exasperation of those at risk. He found himself surrounded mostly by one side as Schoenberg left for the United States (1933), Rudolf Ploderer died of despair by suicide (1933), Berg died of sepsis (1935), and D. Bach, among others (e.g., Greissle, Jalowetz, Krenek, Reich, Steuermann, Wellesz), fled or worse. He considered following Schoenberg, who sought U.S. opportunities for him but discouraged it amid the Great Depression, knowing Webern was deeply attached to home.

Webern's views of Nazism, from accounts and exchanges of correspondence, (Note: Composers' correspondence was conducted with some regard to the possibility of later publication, especially after the nineteenth century. Accounts were often self-admittedly perspectival.) were audience-tailored and nebulous, (Note: Nazism itself was variously outlined, often emphasizing mutually reinforcing anticommunism, expansionist nationalism (Lebensraum), and racialized antisemitism (Judeo-Bolshevism); but historians also noted multipartisan syncretic appeals of a nostalgic, populist nature, with some anti-modernism and irrationalism, socially exclusive communitarianism (Volksgemeinschaft), and criticism of capitalism.) and he sometimes seemed to project his ideals onto the Nazis while shifting standpoints in situational ways. His daughter Amalie recalled that "[a]t one point he was a Red, at one point a Black, then again he was a Nazi, the father—among us, nobody ever knew where they stood". Shy and private, Webern generally maintained an enigmatic, perhaps utopian or pragmatic apoliticism, at least in principle, apart from his pan-Germanism. Kurt List ventured that "[n]ationalist ideas may have saved [Webern] from the concentration camp". (Note: Dissent was punishable under the Treachery Act of 1934.)

==== Visiting conducting career ====
Webern conducted nine concerts as a BBC Symphony visiting conductor (1929–1936). A talkie on his first visit inspired him to ask Steuermann about writing film music (Steuermann wrote his relatives in the film industry, Salka Viertel and Berthold Viertel, for their suggestions). He led then little known Mahler, including both nocturnes from the Symphony No. 7 in 1934. He insisted on rehearsing at the piano with vocalists and was criticized for coaching musical phrasing.

In Barcelona, he withdrew from the 1936 world premiere of Berg's Violin Concerto, grief-stricken after Berg's death and overwhelmed by difficulties. He "pleaded and exhorted the players to feel the inner expressive content of one, two, or three notes at a time", Krasner recalled, "rehearsing repeatedly a single motif, one bar of music and only finally, a two- or four-bar phrase."

The two then played the concerto in London with BBC musicians, who rehearsed before Webern arrived. Kenneth Anthony Wright noted Webern's "funny little explanations of the varying dynamics and flexibility of tempo", but, said Krasner, "every syllable and every gesture of Webern was understood and lovingly heeded". Sidonie Goossens recalled they "all admired and respected Webern", but Berthold Goldschmidt remembered him as "Kapellmeister Zig-Zag". Goldschmidt, Felix Aprahamian, and Benjamin Britten criticized his conducting, and BBC management did not invite him back after 1936.

=== 1938–1939: Inner emigration in Nazi Germany ===
==== Anschluss ====
Krasner's last visit with Webern was interrupted by Kurt Schuschnigg's broadcast speech that the Anschluss was imminent. Krasner had been playing some of Schoenberg's Violin Concerto for Webern and trying to convince him to write a sonata for solo violin. When Webern turned on the radio and heard this speech, he urged Krasner to flee. Because Webern's family included Nazis, Krasner wondered whether Webern had already known that the Anschluss was planned for that day. He also wondered whether Webern's warning had been solely for his safety or whether it had also been to save Webern the embarrassment of the violinist's presence in the event of celebration at the Webern home.

Much of Austria did celebrate. But Webern made only a terse note of the Anschluss in his notebook without registering any clear emotion. In fact, he wrote Jone and her husband Josef Humplik asking not to be disturbed as he was "totally immersed" in work on Op. 28. Thus, Bailey Puffett suggested that Webern may have received Krasner's visit as a distraction.

By now, Hartmut Krones wrote, Webern likely realized his error in anticipating the Nazis' self-moderation. Bailey Puffett proposed that Krasner, with the benefit of hindsight from the perspective of his 1987 account, may have resented Webern for "refusing to see the reality of Hitler's antisemitism", at least until after 1936. That year, Webern had insisted that Krasner and he travel through Nazi Germany to stop at a Munich train station café, where Krasner said "anything untoward was the least likely to happen", in an attempt to demonstrate the lack of danger.

Support for the Anschluss rested on antisemitism, economic prospects, (Note: Austrofascists enacted unpopular economic measures amid 1930s mass unemployment; the Nazis waged economic warfare (e.g., the thousand-mark ban).) and the old idea of a Greater Germany. (Note: Austrian pan-Germans, Grossdeutschen, or Deutschnationalisten hoped for stable prosperity via some form of Greater German nation-state like the Reich. This hope was shared by some Social Democrats and was not alien to Social Christians. The Greater German People's Party received a maximum of 17% of the vote during 1919–1933 elections, mostly from students, teachers, and civil servants. They were most popular in Styria and Carinthia. First they governed with the Social Christians. Austrian Nazis won their parliamentary seats by 1933. That year they joined forces with the Social Democrats. They had Nazi affinity, though not identity, as of 1934. Schuschnigg described Hitler's plans for Austria as "pan-German" in 1936.) Under some duress, Theodor Innitzer ushered in Catholic support. The Austrian Nazis and Social Democrats, both outlawed, were linked in opposition to the Austrofascists. Before the Austrofascist years (1933–1938) of Gleichschaltung and Nazi soft power, Karl Renner supported unification as a matter of self-determination. (Note: Deteriorating German-Austrian relations and Austrian weakening were marked by the July Putsch, assassinations (including Engelbert Dollfuss's), and terror (including bombings "almost daily" in Austria).) Now he and others supported or accepted the Anschluss as inevitable. Otto Bauer, in exile, expressed some acceptance with profound resignation and misgivings, having worked toward Austria's German incorporation since Provisional National Assembly's 1918 vote. Webern had long shared in common pan-German sentiments, especially during wartime. He also likely hoped to conduct again, securing a firmer future for his family under a new regime proclaiming itself "socialist" no less than nationalist. According to what Josef Polnauer, a fellow early Schoenberg pupil, historian, and librarian, told the Moldenhauers, Webern's optimism was not dispelled until 1941.

Krasner emphasized Webern's "naiveté" but acknowledged that he himself had been "foolhardy" as to the danger of antisemitism, recalling "read[ing] in the papers ... denials" and "want[ing] to see for myself" in 1938. (Note: Krasner further recalled that only his U.S. passport saved him from locals and police when revisiting Vienna in 1941 to help friends (e.g., Schoenberg's daughter Gertrude, her husband Felix Greissle) emigrate.) Consensus had emerged on the center, left, and in some mainstream Jewish organizations that antisemitism was only a means to political power since its 1890s definition as the "socialism of fools". The Frankfurt School first treated it within the rubric of class conflict (Adorno began to consider it otherwise in his 1939 "Fragments on Wagner"), and Franz Neumann briefly contended that the Nazis would "never allow a complete extermination of the Jews" in his 1942 Behemoth (before revisions in 1944).

==== Kristallnacht and recoil ====
Kristallnacht shocked Webern, who thought that reports of Nazi atrocities were politicized, unreliable propaganda. He visited and aided Jewish colleagues D. Bach, Otto Jokl, Polnauer, and Hugo Winter. For Jokl, a former Berg pupil, Webern wrote a recommendation letter to facilitate emigration. When that failed, Webern served as his godfather in a 1939 baptism. Polnauer, whose emigration Mark Brunswick, Schoenberg, and Webern were unable to secure, managed to survive the Holocaust as an albino and later edited a 1959 U.E. publication of Webern's correspondence from this time with Humplik and Jone. Webern moved Humplik's 1929 gift of a Mahler bust to his bedroom, having told Felix Greissle in 1936 or 1937 that Mahler's time would come within a German Kulturnation and D. Bach that "not all Germans are Nazis".

With "almost all his friends and old pupils ... gone", Webern found himself increasingly alone, and his financial situation was poor. He talked to Polnauer about emigrating but was reluctant to leave home and family. He entered a period of "inward emigration" and focused on composition, writing to artist Franz Rederer in 1939, "We live completely withdrawn. I work a lot." He corresponded extensively to maintain relationships, imploring his student George Robert to play Schoenberg in New York and expressing his loneliness and isolation to Schoenberg. Then war limited postal service, disrupting their direct correspondence completely by 1941.

=== 1939–1945: Hope and disillusionment during World War II ===
==== Swiss and Reich prospects ====
Webern's mature music was performed mostly outside the Reich, where only his tonal music and arrangements were allowed as works not in the style of a "Judenknecht". In 1941, his arrangement of two of Schubert's German Dances was performed in Leipzig and broadcast in the Reich and Fascist Italy. In 1942, his Passacaglia, Op. 1 was considered for a Viennese contemporary music festival, Karl Böhm or Wilhelm Furtwängler conducting. Instead, Hans Rosbaud likely performed it in occupied Strasbourg that year, and Luigi Dallapiccola sought to have it performed in Venice in 1943. Hans Schmidt-Isserstedt planned to conduct Webern's arrangement of the six-voice ricercar from Bach's Musical Offering at the Deutsche Oper Berlin in 1943, but war intervened.

Supported by IGNM-Sektion Basel, the Orchester Musikkollegium Winterthur, and Werner Reinhart, Webern attended three Swiss concerts, his last trips outside the Reich. In 1940, Erich Schmid conducted Op. 1 in Winterthur; soprano Marguerite Gradmann-Lüscher sang Op. 4 and most of Op. 12 (not No. 3) at the Musik-Akademie der Stadt Basel, Schmid accompanying. In February 1943, Scherchen gave the world premiere of Op. 30 at the Winterthur Stadthaus, and Webern interpreted the attention of a German consul as a sign that his standing in the Reich might improve. He had intimated to Willi Reich that he might immigrate to Switzerland, joking (October 1939) "Anything of the sort did seem quite out of the question for me!" But he failed to find employment, even as a formality, likely due to anti-German sentiment in the context of Swiss neutrality and refugee laws.

In the Reich, he met with former Society violist Othmar Steinbauer about a formal teaching role in Vienna in early 1940, but nothing materialized. From 1940 to 1942, he lectured at the homes of Erwin Ratz and Carl Prohaska's widow Margaret. Many private pupils came to him between 1940 and 1943, even from afar, among them briefly Karl Amadeus Hartmann. Hartmann, who opposed the Nazis, remembered that Webern counseled him to respect authority, at least publicly, for the sake of order.

==== Wartime hopes and reality ====
Sharing in wartime public sentiment at the height of Hitler's popularity (2 May 1940), Webern credited him as "unique" and emphatically "singular" for "the new state", the Greater Germanic Reich, "for which the seed was already laid twenty years ago" (in the Republic of German-Austria), though not without "concern" despite his usual hopeful optimism. (Note: Webern wrote at some length: "This is Germany today! But the National Socialist one, to be sure! Not just any one! This is exactly the new state, for which the seed was already laid twenty years ago. Yes, a new state it is, one that has never existed before!! It is something new! Created by this unique man!!! Look here, you sense my concern: that one could (in the end) consider as matter of fact what has evolved in so remarkable a way, what indeed could spring forth only from this nature, what has for its originator this singular man. Do write to me again quite soon and report to me what you find out. Such commentaries as your last ones are enormously important to me! Each day becomes more exciting. I see such a good future. It will be different also for me.) He was corresponding patriotically with Joseph Hueber, an active soldier, baritone soloist, former neighbor, and gardening and mountaineering companion who often sent him gifts like rationed tobacco. Indeed, Hueber had just sent him Mein Kampf, prompting his immediate reply (4 March 1940) that, while it "brought [him] much enlightenment", he "wondered", from his "personal experiences", "how such opposites could have become possible next to each other."

Apparently unaware of Stefan George's aversion to the Nazis, he reread Das neue Reich (The New Reich) and marveled suggestively at the wartime leader envisioned therein, but "I am not taking a position!" he wrote Hans Humpelstetter, also an active soldier and singer but unlike Hueber, a onetime Social Democrat. For Johnson, "Webern's own image of a neue Reich was never of this world; if his politics were ultimately complicitous it was largely because his utopian apoliticism played so easily into ... the status quo."

By August 1940, Webern depended financially on his children. That year, he applied for wartime emergency relief funds from Künstlerhilfe Wien and for Künstlerdank from the Reichsmusikkammer, receiving support into 1944 despite declaring himself a non-member of the Nazi Party. (Whether he ever joined the party remains unknown.) (Note: In the tradition of parties seeking a dues-paying mass membership, formal NSDAP affiliation could oblige one to pay registration fees or dues, or even to labor. Nazis dissuaded some prospective members from formal affiliation as a strategic matter.) He secured aid by presenting himself to officials as a loyal, propaganda-reading citizen with a Nazi family, whether out of conviction, opportunism, or need. In February 1941, authorities accepted this, assessing him as a harmless musician with some degree of prior Social-Democrat affiliation. These funds became his sole income after 1942, and his savings were nearly exhausted by 1944.

His 1943–1945 letters were strewn with references to bombings, death, destruction, privation, and the disintegration of local order, but several grandchildren were born. In December 1943, aged 60, he wrote from a barrack that he was working 6 am–5 pm as an air-raid protection police officer, conscripted into the war effort. He corresponded with Willi Reich about IGNM-Sektion Basel's concert marking his sixtieth: Paul Baumgartner played Op. 27, Walter Kägi Op. 7, and August Wenzinger Op. 11; Gradmann-Lüscher sang Op. 3 and the world premiere of Op. 23. For Schoenberg's 70th birthday (1944), Webern asked Reich to convey "my most heartfelt remembrances, ... longing! ... hopes for a happy future!" In February 1945, Webern's only son Peter, intermittently conscripted since 1940, was killed in an air attack, and airstrike sirens interrupted the family's mourning at the funeral.

==== Refuge and death in Mittersill ====
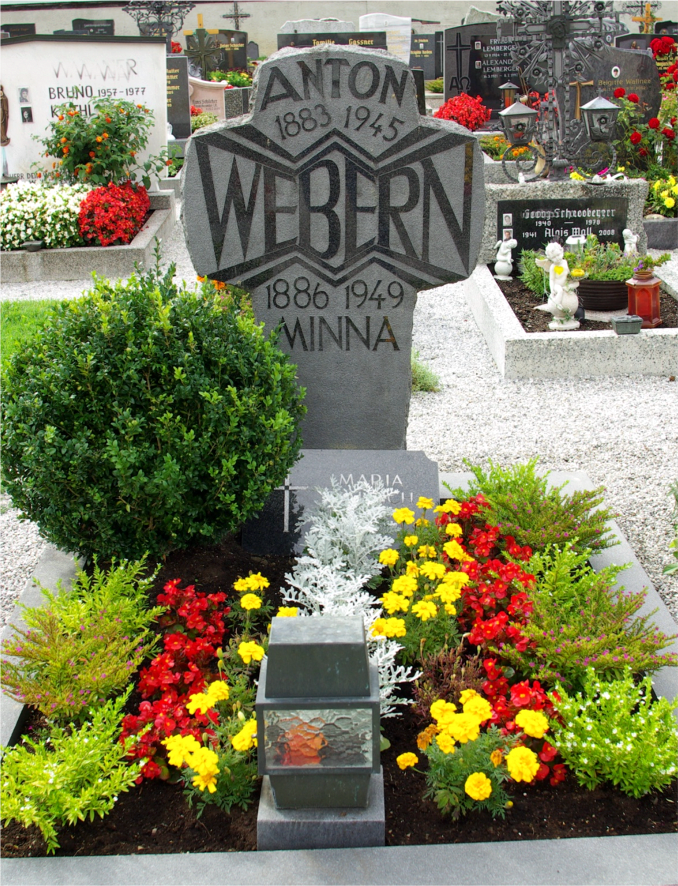
Grave of Webern and his wife Minna at the cemetery in Mittersill

The Weberns assisted Schoenberg's eldest son, Georg, during the war, and with the Red Army's April 1945 arrival imminent, they gave him their Mödling apartment, the childhood home of Webern's son-in-law Benno Mattel. (Note: Schoenberg was unable to secure Georg's emigration despite many attempts. Between the Russian–German language barrier and Nazi munitions and propaganda in the apartment's storeroom, Georg was held and nearly executed as a Nazi spy but was able to convince a German-speaking Jewish officer otherwise. Georg and his family remained there until 1969.) Georg later told Krasner that Webern "felt he'd betrayed his best friends." The Weberns fled west, resorting to traveling partly on foot to Mittersill to rejoin their family of "17 persons pressed together in the smallest possible space".

On the night of 15 September 1945, in Allied-occupied Austria, Webern was smoking outside alone. U.S. soldier Raymond Bell of North Carolina fatally shot him, claiming self-defense after bumping into him (Bell later expressed guilt and died of alcoholism in 1955). The soldiers were there on a sting operation, as Mattel had sought food, cigars, coffee, and U.S. dollars from them on the black market amid widespread hunger and rationing. Webern had been following Thomas Mann's suppressed work, noting in 1944 that Mann had finished Joseph and His Brothers. His last notebook entry quoted Rainer Maria Rilke: "Who speaks of victory? To endure is everything." (Note: Webern had not set Rilke's work since Op. 8. Schoenberg dedicated a 1915 setting of Rilke's "Alle, welche dich suchen", Op. 22/ii, to Webern.)

Webern's wife Wilhelmine ("Minna") endured final years of grief, poverty, and loneliness as friends and family continued emigrating. She wished Webern had lived to see more success. Alfred Schlee asked her for the hidden manuscripts of Opp. 17, 24–25, and 29–31 to publish, and she worked to get Webern's 1907 Piano Quintet published via Kurt List. In 1947 she wrote to Diez, now in the U.S., that by 1945 Webern was "firmly resolved to go to England". Likewise, in 1946 she wrote to D. Bach in London: "How difficult the last eight years had been for him. ... [H]e had only the one wish: to flee from this country. But one was caught, without a will of one's own. ... It was close to the limit of endurance what we had to suffer." She died in 1949.

== Music ==
Tell me, can one at all denote thinking and feeling as things entirely separable? I cannot imagine a sublime intellect without the ardor of emotion.

— Webern wrote to Schoenberg (June 1910). Theodor W. Adorno described Webern as "propound[ing] musical expressionism in its strictest sense, ... to such a point that it reverts of its own weight to a new objectivity".

Webern's music was generally concise, organic, and parsimonious, (Note: Webern repeatedly emphasized Zusammenhang, translated as unity, coherence, or connection. Jonathan Kramer wrote that Webern's definition of unity was "utmost relatedness" and that he sought "to develop everything else from one principal idea!" Kramer noted that most prior music and theory shared Webern's emphasis. But Webern's zeal and rigor fit more with twentieth-century modernism, and his approach added complexity, Kramer argued. Sibelius was also noted for his organicism and natural topics. British concert programs posed him as an alternative to the Second Viennese School. Adorno and Leibowitz criticized him.) with very small motifs, palindromes, and parameterization on both the micro- and macro-scale. His idiosyncratic approach reflected affinities with Schoenberg, Mahler, (Note: Taruskin noted Webern's "descent from Mahler". Keith Fitch glossed Webern as "crystallized Mahler". The opening of Webern's Op. 21 echoed that of Mahler's Ninth.) Guido Adler and early music; interest in esotericism and Naturphilosophie; and thorough perfectionism. (Note: This was noted in his performances.) He engaged with the work of Goethe, Bach, (Note: Webern engaged with Bach in two phases, first as a student. Later, he conducted Bach's music ten times (1927–1935), finding inspiration in it while writing his twelve-tone music. He made some connections between his and Bach's music to make his own more easily understandable and to emphasize his place in established tradition. Webern cited the two-movement (overture–dance suite) form of Bach's orchestral suites as one model for the two-movement form of his Op. 21 (writing to Schoenberg), the instrumentation of the Brandenburg Concertos as inspiration for that of his Op. 24 (writing to Hertzka), and Bach's B-minor badinerie as the model for the Op. 27/ii scherzo (in coaching Peter Stadlen). Writing to Stein, Webern confirmed (as Polnauer had already noticed) that the BACH motif was the motivic basis of his Op. 28, but "secretly ... never ... in this ostentatious transposition!!!" He asked Stein not to publicize this in Tempo. In the same letter, Webern also outlined a complex synthesis of musical forms in Op. 28/iii, specifically identifying Bach's influence in the fugal element.) and the Franco-Flemish School in addition to that of Wolf, Brahms, (Note: Webern's Op. 27/i was perhaps modeled on Brahms's Op. 116/v.) Wagner, Liszt, Schumann, Beethoven, Schubert ("so genuinely Viennese"), and Mozart. (Note: Webern often referred to the Franco-Flemish School as "the Netherlanders." In February 1905 Webern recorded in his diary, "Mahler pointed out ... Rameau ... Bach, Brahms, and Wagner as ... contrapuntalists ... . '... Just as in nature the entire universe has developed from the primeval cell ... beyond to God ... so also in music should a large structure develop [entirely] from a single motive ... .' Variation is ... most important ... . A theme [must] be ... beautiful ... to make its unaltered return ... . ... [M]usicians [should] combine ... contrapuntal skill ... with ... melodiousness". In January 1931, Schoenberg responded to Webern's plan for lectures: "... show the logical development towards twelve-tone composition. ... [T]he Netherlands School, Bach for counterpoint, Mozart for phrase formation [and] motivic treatment, Beethoven [and] Bach for development, Brahms, and ... Mahler for varied and highly complex treatment. ... [T]itle ... : 'The path to twelve-tone composition.'" J. Peter Burkholder generalized his claim that "the use of existing music as a basis for new music is pervasive in all periods"; he had focused on "the historicist mainstream" within the proximal eighteenth and especially nineteenth and twentieth centuries. Adriaan Peperzak, writing about the taste of "most intellectuals" at the end of the 20th century as "a plurality of cultural homes" (or about "the 'modern museum of cultures'"), stressed a general connection between new and old represented also in music (i.e., both "after" and before tonality or common practice), observing that "whereas certain works of Bartók and Stravinsky already are experienced as difficult", "Josquin des Prez, Gesualdo, Webern and Boulez seem to be reserved to a small elite, and we continue to refer to traditional art in learning how to compose new works and how to listen to the extraordinary works made according to non-traditional codes.") Stylistic shifts were not neatly coterminous with gradually developed technical devices, particularly in the case of his mid-period Lieder. (Note: For example, his first use of twelve-tone technique in Op. 17, Nos. 2 and 3, was more technical than stylistic, and Adorno felt that Op. 14 sounded twelve-tone.)

His music was also characteristically linear and song-like. Much of it (and Berg's and Schoenberg's) was for singing. (Note: Their instrumental music has been related to vocal idioms: the "concealed vocality" and "latent opera" of Berg's Lyric Suite and the Bach chorale and folk melody of his Violin Concerto; the "recitative" of Schoenberg's Op. 16/v and the accented musical prose of his twelve-tone music. Unlike Berg and Schoenberg, Webern did not use Hauptstimmen and Nebenstimmen, but he endorsed textures of accompanied melody in his music's polyphony. He could not stop writing songs, he told Berg (1921) and Hertzka (1927), noting his work's "almost exclusively lyrical nature" and apologizing to Hertzka for the consequently inauspicious commercial implications.) Johnson described the song-like gestures of Op. 11/i. In Webern's mid-period Lieder, some heard instrumentalizing of the voice (often in relation to the clarinet) representing yet some continuity with bel canto. (Note: Berg endorsed an innovative, pluralist approach emphasizing some bel canto and like Webern, expressed faith in singers to execute challenging lines.) Lukas Näf described one of Webern's signature hairpins (on the Op. 21/i mm. 8–9 bass clarinet tenuto note) as a messa di voce requiring some rubato to execute faithfully. (Note: Hairpins were arguably read as tenuto-like agogic accents.) Adventurous textures and timbres, and melodies of wide leaps and sometimes extreme ranges and registers were typical.

For Johnson, Webern's rubato compressed Mahler's "'surging and ebbing'" tempi; this and Webern's dynamics indicated a "vestigial lyrical subjectivity." Webern often set carefully chosen lyric poetry. He related his music not only to nostalgia for the lost family and home of his youth, but also to his Alpinism and fascination with plant aromatics and morphology. He was compared to Mahler in his orchestration and semantic preoccupations (e.g., memory, landscapes, nature, loss, often Catholic mysticism). In Jone, who he met with her husband Humplik via the Hagenbund, Webern found a lyricist who shared his esoteric, natural, and spiritual interests. She provided texts for his late vocal works.

Webern's and Schoenberg's music distinctively prioritized minor seconds, major sevenths, and minor ninths (Note: Some exceptions included Webern's Op. 23.) as noted in 1934 by microtonalist Alois Hába. The Kholopov siblings noted the semitone's unifying role by axial inversional symmetry and octave equivalence as interval class 1 (ic1), approaching Allen Forte's generalized pitch-class set analysis. Webern's consistent use of ic1 in cells and sets, often expressed as a wide interval musically, (Note: Webern found Bartók's String Quartet No. 4 "cacophonous" for its clusters of semitones.) was well noted. (Note: Philip Ewell cited Erhard Karkoschka, Kolneder, Heinz-Klaus Metzger, Henri Pousseur, and Karlheinz Stockhausen on this point.) Symmetric pitch-interval practices varied in rigor and use by others (e.g., Berg, Schoenberg, Bartók, Debussy, Stravinsky; more nascently Mahler, Brahms, Bruckner, (Note: Eliahu Inbal, whose work with the hr-Sinfonieorchester in the 1980s was part of a Bruckner reappraisal, found additional connections between Bruckner and Webern and Romantics and modernists more generally, echoing Dika Newlin and Mahler himself.) Liszt, Wagner). Berg and Webern took symmetric approaches to elements of music beyond pitch. Webern later linked pitches and other parameters in schemes (e.g., fixed or "frozen" register).

Relatively few of Webern's works were published in his lifetime. Amid fascism and Emil Hertzka's passing, this included late as well as early works (in addition to others without opus numbers). His rediscovery prompted many publications, but some early works were unknown until after the work of the Moldenhauers well into the 1980s, obscuring formative facets of his musical identity. Thus when Boulez first oversaw a project to record Webern's music, the results fit on three CDs and the second time, six. (Note: Performers also relaxed their tempi.) A historical edition of his music has remained in progress.

=== 1899–1908: Formative juvenilia and emergence from study ===
Webern's pre-opus compositions went unpublished during his lifetime (and only surfaced well into his posthumous reception). His earliest works were mostly Lieder setting texts by Richard Dehmel, Gustav Falke, and Theodor Storm. He set seven Ferdinand Avenarius poems on the "changing moods" of life and nature (1899–1904). Schubert, Schumann, and Wolf were important models. With its brief, potent expressivity and utopianization of the natural world, the (German) Romantic Lied had a lasting influence on Webern's musical aesthetic. He never abandoned its lyricism, intimacy, and wistful or nostalgic topics, though his music became more abstract, idealized, and introverted.

Webern memorialized the Preglhof in a diary poem "An der Preglhof" and in the tone poem Im Sommerwind (1904), both after Bruno Wille's idyll. In Webern's Sommerwind, Derrick Puffett found affinities with Strauss's Alpensinfonie, Charpentier's Louise, and Delius's Paris.

At the Preglhof in summer 1905, Webern wrote his tripartite, single-movement string quartet in a highly modified sonata form, likely responding to Schoenberg's Op. 7. He quoted Jakob Böhme in the preface and mentioned the panels (Note: La vita, La natura, and La morte; or Life, Nature, and Death) of Segantini's Trittico della natura (Note: Alpine Triptych (1898–1899)) as "Werden–Sein–Vergehen" (Note: "Becoming–Being–Bygone") in sketches. Sebastian Wedler argued that this quartet bore the influence of Richard Strauss's Also Sprach Zarathustra in its germinal three-note motive, opening fugato of its third (development) section, and Nietzschean reading (via eternal recurrence) of Segantini's triptych. In its opening harmonies, Allen Forte and Heinz-Klaus Metzger noted Webern's anticipation of Schoenberg's atonality in Op. 10.

In 1906, Schoenberg assigned Webern Bach chorales to harmonize and figure; Webern completed eighteen in a highly chromatic idiom. Next, he composed the somewhat Brahmsian single-movement Piano Quintet (1907) in sonata form.

==== From 1908: Emergence and opera sketches ====
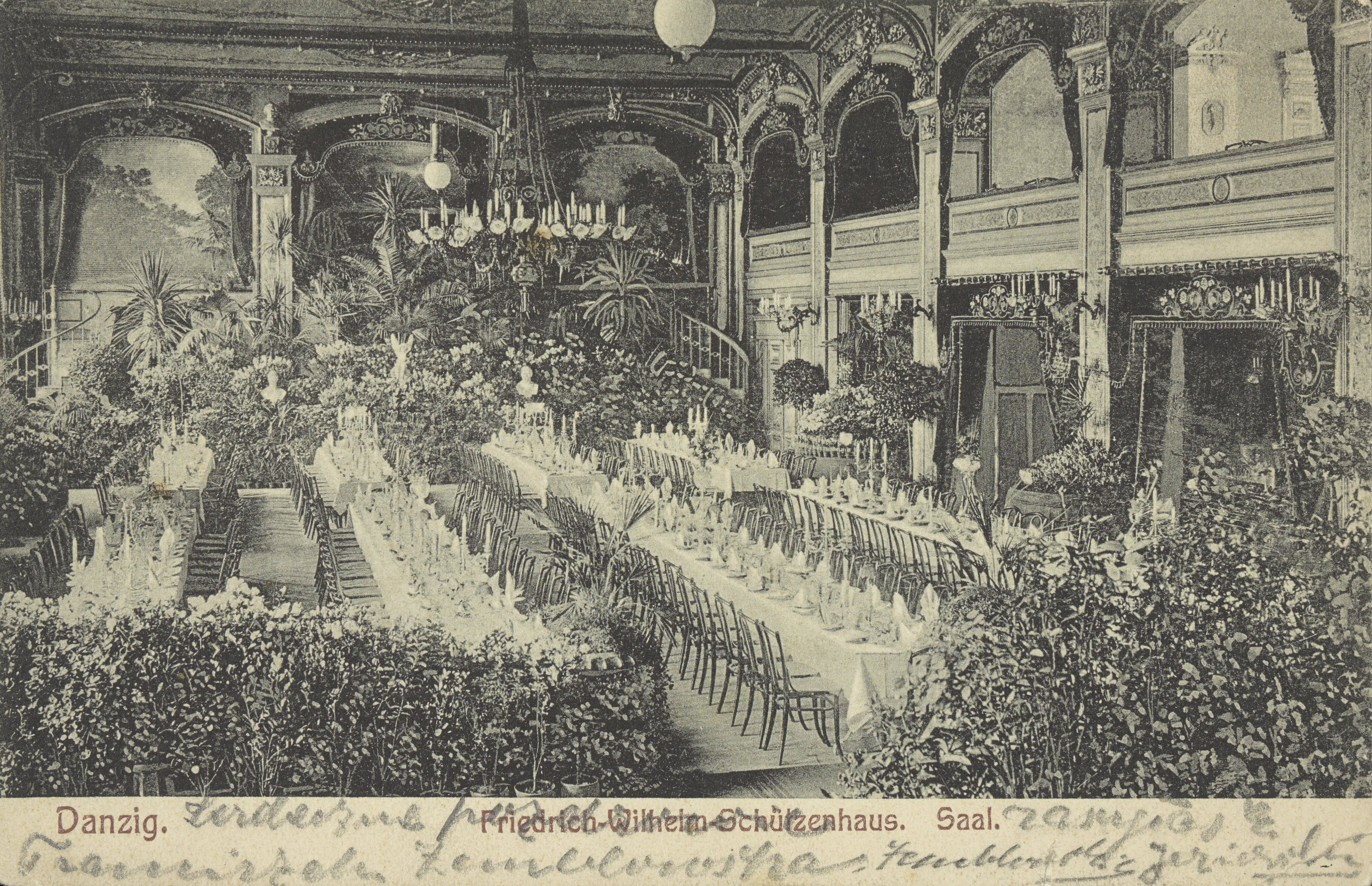
Danzig's Friedrich-Wilhelm-Schützenhaus in a 1906 postcard photograph

The Passacaglia, Op. 1 (1908), modeled openly on that of Brahms's Fourth, was Webern's graduation piece. Its chromaticism and innovative orchestration distinguished it from prior works, and its use of form foreshadowed works to come. Conducting its 1911 premiere at Danzig's Friedrich-Wilhelm-Schützenhaus, he paired it with Debussy's 1894 Prélude à l'après-midi d'un faune, Ludwig Thuille's 1896 Romantische Ouvertüre, and Mahler's 1901–1904 Kindertotenlieder for a poorly attended "modern evening" concert. The Danziger Zeitung called it an "insane experiment". The Op. 2 choral canons (1908) soon followed.

Also in 1908, Webern began an opera on Maeterlinck's Alladine et Palomides, of which only unfinished sketches were found, and in 1912 he wrote Berg that he had finished one or more scenes for another planned but unrealized opera, Die sieben Prinzessinnen, on Maeterlinck's Les Sept Princesses. He had been an opera enthusiast from his student days. Debussy's Pelléas et Mélisande enraptured him twice in Berlin in December 1908 and again in Vienna in 1911. As a vocal coach and opera conductor, he knew the repertoire "perfectly ... every cut, ... unmarked cadenza, and in the comic operas every theatrical joke". He "adored" Mozart's Il Seraglio and revered Strauss, predicting Salome would last. When in high spirits, Webern would sing bits of Lortzing's Zar und Zimmermann, a personal favorite. He expressed interest (to Max Deutsch) in writing an opera pending a good text and adequate time; in 1930, he asked Jone for "opera texts, or rather dramatic texts", planning cantatas instead.

=== 1908–1914: Atonality and aphorisms ===
Fünf Sätze for string quartet, Op. 5, I. Heftig bewegt (Schloss Preglhof, spring 1909) – Emerson String Quartet
Spending summer 1909 with Webern (et al.) and seeing his Op. 5 manuscript reinvigorated Schoenberg's music, inspiring him to write Busoni: "... away with [from] 'motivic working out.' Away with harmony as cement or bricks of a building. Harmony is expression and nothing else. ... Away with Pathos [and] protracted ten-ton scores ... . My music must be brief. Concise! In two notes: not built, but expressed!! ... no stylized and sterile protracted emotion. People are not like that" (Schoenberg's emphases).

After Op. 2, Webern and Schoenberg's music was freely atonal. In publications of two song cycles, Opp. 3–4 (officially 1908–1909), Webern selected from fourteen Stefan George settings dating from as early as 1907. Some of Webern, Schoenberg, and Berg's music from this time was published in Der Blaue Reiter Almanach. Schoenberg and Webern were so mutually influential, the former later joked, "I haven't the slightest idea who I am". In Op. 5/iii, Webern borrowed from Schoenberg's Op. 10/ii. In Op. 5/iv, he may have borrowed the motif to which the words "Ich fühle luft" ("I feel the air") are set in Schoenberg's Op. 10/iv.

The first of Webern's innovative and increasingly extremely aphoristic Opp. 5–11 (1909–1914) radically influenced Schoenberg's Opp. 11/iii (Note: Op. 11/iii (mid-1909) so differed from Op. 11/i–ii (February 1909) that when Bartók performed Op. 11 (23 April 1921 Budapest, 4 April 1922 Paris), he omitted it.) and 16–17 (and Berg's Opp. 4–5). Here, Martin Zenck considered, Webern did not seek "the new ... in [music of] the past but in the future". In writing the Op. 9 bagatelles, Webern reflected in 1932, "I had the feeling that when the twelve notes had all been played the piece was over." "[H]aving freed music from the shackles of tonality", Schoenberg wrote, he and his pupils believed "music could renounce motivic features". This "intuitive aesthetic" arguably proved to be aspirational insofar as motives, cells, or at least motivic processes existed and persisted in their music.

Two enduring topics emerged in Webern's work: familial (especially maternal) loss and memory, often involving some religious experience; and abstracted landscapes idealized as spiritual, even pantheistic, Heimat (e.g., the Preglhof, the Eastern Alps). Webern explored these ideas explicitly in his Symbolist stage play Tot: Sechs Bilder für die Bühne (Dead: Six Scenes for the Stage, October 1913). The play comprises six tableaux vivants (Note: Maurice Maeterlinck's notion of static drama influenced Webern.) set in the Alps, over the course of which a mother and father reflect on and come to terms with the loss of their son. (Note: Webern was likely inspired by the sudden death of his nephew, Theo Clementschitsch, who died on holiday in Italy. Webern had to negotiate the return of his body to Austria.) The script specifies exact lighting, sounds, delivery, and gestures to match mood, time, and place, with birds, bells, and flowers as important elements of a still, holy world. Webern drew so heavily from Swedenborg's theological doctrine of correspondences, quoting from Vera Christiana Religio at length, that Schoenberg considered the play unoriginal.

Webern sublimated these concerns into his music. Writing to Berg and Schoenberg, he outlined the program of Op. 6 in January 1913 as Schoenberg planned to lead its March premiere at the Skandalkonzert:

The first piece is to express my frame of mind ... already sensing the disaster, yet ... maintaining the hope that I would find my mother still alive. It was a beautiful day—for a minute I believed ... nothing had happened. Only during the train ride to Carinthia ... did I learn the truth. The third piece conveys ... the fragrance of the Erica, which I gathered ... in the forest ... and ... laid on the bier. (Note: Webern wrote Berg that August, "the heather from the middle of August is my favourite flower. It's most beautiful in a forest clearing, where the sun can reach, that wonderful sun, where it is against the grass, and the bees and bumble-bees are upon it, and that scent. I've indulged in orgies there, standing motionless, my eyes closed, that's my favourite. Have I already told you, that the 3rd piece of my orchestral pieces was born from such an impression. Directly. The scent of heather. But of course, that is the scent of heather which I laid on my mother's coffin.") The fourth piece I later entitled marcia funebre. Even today I do not understand my feelings as I walked behind the coffin to the cemetery. ... The evening ... was miraculous. With my wife I went ... again to the cemetery ... . I had the feeling of my mother's ... presence.

As Webern's music took on the character of such static dramaticovisual scenes, his pieces frequently culminated in the accumulation and amalgamation (often the developing variation) of compositional material. Fragmented melodies frequently began and ended on weak beats, settled into or emerged from ostinati, and were dynamically and texturally faded, mixed, or contrasted. Tonality became less directional, functional, or narrative than tenuous, spatial, or symbolic as fit Webern's topics and literary settings. Stein thought that "his compositions should be understood as musical visions". (Note: "Ecstasy was [Webern's] natural state of mind", Stein recalled.) Oliver Korte traced Webern's Klangfelder (Note: "fields of sound", sound-fields) to Mahler's "suspensions". (Note: For Adorno, these were an "essential" Mahlerian formal "genre", often episodic as in a section of music marked senza tempo. Korte compared Webern's Op. 10/iii to the passage before Mahler's "Chorus mysticus".)

Expanding on Mahler's orchestration, Webern linked colorful, novel, fragile, and intimate sounds, often nearly silent at ppp, to lyrical topics: solo violin to female voice; closed or open voicings, sometimes sul ponticello, to dark or light respectively; compressed range to absence, emptiness, or loneliness; registral expansion to fulfillment, (spiritual) presence, or transcendence; (Note: Beethoven's similar use of registral expansion was noted (e.g., Op. 111, No. 2, Var. 5 when the theme re-emerges in a strange harmonic context after a long section of trills).) celesta, harp, and glockenspiel to the celestial or ethereal; and trumpet, harp, and string harmonics to angels or heaven. (Note: Examples included the circling ostinati of Op. 6/v and the end of Op. 15/v.)

With elements of Kabarett, (Note: See Sprechgesang. Schoenberg briefly directed and wrote for the Überbrettl, for example, in the 1901 Brettl-Lieder.) neoclassicism, (Note: Examples included passacaglia in "Nacht", fugue in "Der Mondfleck", and canon in both.) and ironic Romanticism (Note: Examples included the virtuoso solo and waltz in "Serenade" and triadic harmony in "O alter Duft".) in Pierrot lunaire, Op. 21 (1912), Schoenberg began (Note: "Galgenlied" was still quite short.) to distance himself from Webern's and latterly Berg's aphoristic expressionism, which would provoke the Skandalkonzert. Alma recalled Schoenberg telling her and Franz Werfel "how much he was suffering under the dangerous influence of Webern", drawing on "all his strength to extricate himself from it".

=== 1913–1926: Mid-period vocal works ===
Around World War I, Webern worked on almost sixty songs, thirty-two finished and grouped as Opp. 12–19, many of which explore topics tied to memories. Of these, at least nineteen songs, eight finished, survive in two or more settings (as many as nine for Op. 14/vi, "Gesang einer gefangenen Amsel"), each exploring somewhat related musical ideas rather than clearly working toward a single definitive version. For each trial, he intuited motivic–timbral material, using it as an opening instrumental gesture and then as the vocal line, restarting if it proved undevelopable.

==== From 1913: Extension via song ====
The posthumously grouped Three Orchestral Songs (1913–1914), two of which set Webern's own texts ("O sanftes Glühn der Berge" and "Leise Düfte"), were written for an unrealized orchestral set and echo Op. 10 in their intensely varied textures and timbres. Other works from the start of his middle period include an unfinished setting of Dante's Paradiso, Canto XXXI ("In einer lichten Rose", 1914) and Op. 13/ii ("Die Einsame", 1914).

Webern continued sketching instrumental pieces, briefly breaking aphoristic limits in his 1914 Cello Sonata only to revert in Op. 11 later that year. Influenced by Schoenberg, who (especially after the Skandalkonzert) encouraged moving past aphoristic miniatures via text-setting, Webern began setting folk, lyric, and mystical texts, often in dense textures with few pauses and strong dynamics, evoking moral clarity or nostalgic abstraction, sometimes tinged with jamais vu.

This turn only reinforced Webern's poetic concision, and preparing his aphoristic works for publication may have likewise reoriented him toward his own lyricism. Meanwhile, Berg created the large-scale opera Wozzeck (1914–1922) and Schoenberg, writing after the monodrama Erwartung (1909), said he sought a "style for large forms ... to give personal things an objective, general form." (Note: In April 1914, after Op. 22/i, "Seraphita", so wrote Schoenberg to Alma Mahler.) Since 1906, the three had been fascinated by Swedenborgian mysticism and Theosophy, reading Balzac's Louis Lambert and Séraphîta, and Strindberg's Till Damaskus and Jacob lutte. In Schoenberg's semi-autobiographical Die Jakobsleiter (1914–1922, rev. 1944), (Note: Scholarship varied as to the genesis of Jakobsleiter. Two scholars noted work from 1914. Winfried Zillig finished it after Schoenberg's death. Schoenberg told Berg about setting Strindberg's Jacob lutte in spring 1911. Webern introduced Schoenberg to Balzac's Louis Lambert and Séraphîta in March 1911.) Gabriel describes liminal souls' passage to the heavenly threshold: "whether right, whether left, forwards or backwards, uphill or down – one must keep on going without asking what lies ahead or behind". (Note: "Ob rechts, ob links, vorwärts oder rückwärts, bergauf oder bergab – man hat weiterzugehen, ohne zu fragen, was vor oder hinter einem liegt.") Webern saw this as a pitch-space metaphor, and Schoenberg recalled their joy. (Note: In 1941, Schoenberg lectured: "the ... law of the unity of musical space demands an absolute and unitary perception. In this space, as in Swedenborg's heaven (described in Balzac's Séraphîta) there is no absolute down, no right or left, forward or backward." Schoenberg then considered Jakobsleiter a "real twelve-tone composition" for its opening hexachordal ostinato and "Scherzo ... of all the twelve tones".)

Opp. 12–17/i timeline
Year (Note: That is, year of composition, not publication.)	Songs (chronological)
1914	Op. 13/ii (Note: This song, "Die Einsame", predates Op. 11.)
1915	Op. 12/i, iii (Note: "Der Tag ist vergangen", "Schien mir's")
1917	Op. 12/iv, ii (Note: "Gleich und Gleich", "Die geheimnisvolle Flöte"); Op. 13/i (Note: "Wiese im Park"); Op. 14/iv (Note: "Abendland III"); Op. 13/iii (Note: "In der Fremde"); Op. 15/v (Note: "Fahr hin, o Seel'")
1918	Op. 13/iv (Note: "Ein Winterabend")
1919	Op. 14/iii, vi, v, ii (Note: "Abendland II", "Gesang einer gefangenen Amsel", "Nachts", "Abendland I")
1921	Op. 14/i (Note: "Die Sonne"); Op. 15/i, iii (Note: "Das Kreuz, das musst' er tragen", "In Gottes Namen aufstehn")
1922	Op. 15/ii, iv (Note: "Morgenlied", "Mein Weg geht jetzt vorüber")
1923	Op. 16/ii, iii, iv (Note: "Dormi Jesu", "Crux fidelis", "Asperges me")
1924	Op. 17/i (Note: "Armer Sünder, du"); Op. 16/v, i (Note: "Crucem tuam adoramus", "Christus factus est")

From poems' topics and structure, including rhythm and meter, Webern slowly and unevenly found his own approach to atonal composition that was more flowing and line-based than aphoristic, eventually extending toward twelve-tone technique. He looked back stylistically in Op. 13/iv ("Ein Winterabend", 1918) after innovating in Op. 12 (1915–1917), revising many songs to prioritize clarity of pitch relations over timbre. He and Schoenberg had long valued contrapuntal rigor, formal schemes, systematic pitch organization, and motivic development (especially from Brahms), and he had already explored the unordered total chromatic, or aggregate, in Op. 9 (1911) and Op. 11. (Note: Schoenberg had hinted at the twelve-tone idea in Harmonielehre (Harmony theory, 1911).)

In 1915, Webern finally moved beyond aphoristic composition, favoring longer texts and smaller ensembles, and shifting from cells and coloristic timbral effects toward more traditional vocal writing and linear motivic development. Polyphonic part writing governs expression in Opp. 12–16 (1915–1924), and songs from Opp. 12–14 (1915–1921) treat a broken Heimat. Longer melodies appear in the still short collection of Op. 12, which includes many ten- and eleven-pitch sets, and in its first and fourth songs, some twelve-tone sets, at least when repeated notes are counted.

==== From 1917: Planned vocal collections ====
In 1917, after finishing Op. 13/i ("Wiese im Park") and Op. 14/iv ("Abendland III", which pauses only at its end), Webern thanked Schoenberg for the model of his Pierrot and began planning song collections. Opp. 14–16 (1917–1924) variously use Pierrot-like ensembles, melodic material, or contrapuntal procedures. For example, the opening melody of the recitative-like Op. 14/ii ("Abendland I", 1919), to the words "Mond, als träte ein Totes", may be drawn from Schoenberg's Op. 21/iii ("Der Dandy"), mm. 28–30.

Also in this song, Webern prioritized pitch non-repetition more than in his future twelve-tone works, rotating the (unordered) aggregate as phrases' and sections' harmonic rhythm. In the third section (mm. 15–21), the aggregate rotates each measure in gliding leaps across fixed or "frozen" registers, creating static motion to depict a boy frozen in "kristallenen Tränen" (crystalline tears) for the setting of Trakl's stanza on Elis Fröbom (from E. T. A. Hoffmann's 1818 "Die Bergwerke zu Falun"; also dramatized in Hugo von Hofmannsthal's 1906 Das Bergwerk zu Falun).

Op. 15 (1917–1922) has the clarity and discipline of Opp. 14 (1917–1921) and 16 (1923–1924), and marks a turn toward religious texts through Op. 18 (1925). Webern wrote two of its songs after visiting his parents' graves in 1921: Op. 15/i ("Das Kreuz") addresses Mary, mother of Jesus, and Op. 15/iii ("In Gottes Namen aufstehn"), God the Father.

In 1922, Webern wrote Jalowetz of Schoenberg's lectures on "a new type of motivic work ... unfold[ing] the entire development of, if I may say so, our technique (harmony, etc.)". It was "almost everything that has occupied me for about ten years", he added. He saw Schoenberg's transformation of twelve-tone rows as the "solution". In Op. 15/iv ("Morgenlied", 1922), Webern first used a tone row (as the opening vocal line), charting the four basic row forms and integrating tri- and tetrachords into the texture. Recalling Op. 15/v ("Fahr hin, o Seel'", 1917), a double canon setting Rosegger's religious folk text, Op. 16 consists of five simple canons. It features wide leaps for high soprano and clarinets. The fifth and first of these canons, from 1924, were among Webern's earliest uses of twelve-tone technique, preceded only by Op. 17/i ("Armer Sünder, du") and the Kinderstück.

Opp. 17–20 (1924–1927) return to varied textures and timbres. Three songs across Opp. 17–18 (Op. 17/ii, "Liebste Jungfrau", and Op. 18/ii–iii, "Erlösung" and "Ave, Regina coelorum", from 1924 to 1925) glorify Mary, inspired by Mahler's Eighth, which sets the close of Goethe's Faust II (with its eternal feminine). (Note: In total, there are several Marian songs across Opp. 12–19, including Op. 12/i ("Der Tag ist vergangen"), Op. 15/i ("Das Kreuz"), Op. 16/ii ("Dormi Jesu"), and Op. 19/i ("Weiss wie Lilien").) Op. 17 (1924–1925), setting religious folksongs, is Webern's first twelve-tone opus, and like Op. 15, includes birdsong allusions. Op. 18 (1925) is a warm song cycle shaped by Webern's "Minna–Mutter–Königin" image of his wife as sweetheart, mother, and queen, linking earlier topics like angels and maternal love to the Virgin Mary and extending his shift, since the Volkslied, Op. 12/i from private grief toward shared symbols. Its folksy instrumentation evokes Schrammelmusik (perhaps via Schoenberg, who had played cello in a Schrammel quintet) and the Wandervogel movement.

Breaking the solo-voice pattern of Opp. 12–18, the two choruses with ensemble titled Zwei Lieder, Op. 19 (1926) were planned as three. Webern's first settings of Goethe since Op. 12/iv ("Gleich und Gleich") in 1917, they are scored for mixed chorus, celesta, guitar, violin, clarinet, and bass clarinet, combining the ensembles used in Opp. 16–18. As in Opp. 17–18 and Op. 20, fragmented melodies emerge from a busy instrumental texture that repeats pitches, forming a bright, almost heavenly sound space rather than a clear, one-dimensional musical line. Such surface effects may recall Klimt's mosaic style; Webern saw in both Klimt and Mahler a shared feeling for nature and correspondences. They may also parallel Paul Klee's polyphonic painting, in which line, color, and form are interdependent; Klee was as inspired by Goethean science as Webern.

=== 1924–1945: Formal coherence and expansion ===
String Trio, Op. 20, I. Sehr langsam (1926–1927) – LaSalle String Quartet members
An excerpt (mm. 49–59) from the first movement of Webern's String Trio, Op. 20. At 0:07–0:18 in this excerpt (mm. 51–56), there are repeated figures in fixed (or "frozen") register, comprising the first B section of this movement's seven-part ABACABA rondo. Kathryn Bailey Puffett likened them to change ringing by bell ringers.

With Schoenberg leaving Mödling in 1925 and new compositional means at his disposal, Webern obtained more artistic autonomy and aspired to write in larger forms, expanding on the extreme concentration of expression and material in his earlier music. Until the Kinderstück for piano (1924, intended as one of a set), Klavierstück (1925), and Satz for string trio (1925), he had finished only Lieder since a 1914 cello sonata. (Note: Among six non-vocal drafts and sketches were an abandoned string quartet (1917–1918); seventeen measures of music scored for clarinet, trumpet, and violin (1920); and four twelve-tone fragments.) The 1926–1927 String Trio, Op. 20, was his first large-scale non-vocal work in more than a decade. For its 1927 publication, Webern helped Stein write an introduction emphasizing continuity with tradition:

The principle of developing a movement by variation of motives and themes is the same as with the classical masters ... [only] varied more radically here ... . One 'tone series' furnishes the basic material ... . The parts are composed in a mosaic-like manner ...

Schoenberg exploited combinatorial properties of particular tone rows, but Webern focused on prior aspects of a row's internal organization. He exploited small, invariant pitch subsets (or partitions) symmetrically derived via inversion, retrograde, or both (retrograde inversion). He understood his compositional (and precompositional) work with reference to ideas about growth, morphology, and unity that he found represented in Goethe's Urpflanze (proto-plant) and in Goethean science more generally. (Note: Webern wrote, "What you see here (retrograde, canon, etc.—it is always the same) is not to be thought of as "Kunststückerln" [artistic tricks]—that would be ridiculous!")

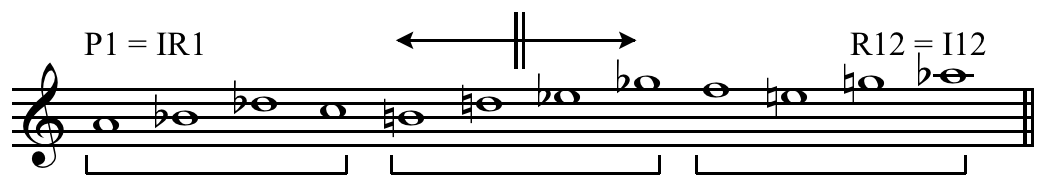
The tone row from Webern's Variations for Orchestra, Op. 30, has only two intervals (minor seconds and minor thirds) and is derived from two hexachords or three tetrachords, yielding half as many basic tone-row forms and ensuring a unity of chords and motives.

Webern's large-scale, non-vocal music in more traditional genres, (Note: viz. the String Trio, Op. 20; Symphony, Op. 21; Quartet, Op. 22; Concerto, Op. 24; Variations for Piano, Op. 27; String Quartet, Op. 28; and Variations for Orchestra, Op. 30) written from 1926 to 1940, has been celebrated as his most rigorous and abstract music. Yet he always wrote his music and tried his new compositional procedures with concern for (or at least some latent reference to) expressivity and representation. (Note: Webern understood his own (and Mahler's) work as crystallizations of personal experience. He wrote Berg in 1912 that an experience would occupy him until it became music "that quite decidedly had to do with the experience—often down to the details". He wrote Schoenberg in 1910 that "[Mahler's symphonies] must be most closely connected with his inner experiences. I also see a development: from the most intense worship of nature to an ever more spiritual, more detached content. ... This ... abstraction ... is more important for me ... than ... techni[que].") In sketches for his Op. 22 quartet, Webern conceived of his themes in programmatic association with his experiences—as an "outlook into the highest region" or a "coolness of early spring (Anninger, (Note: The Anninger to which Webern referred was a hill in the Vienna Woods above Mödling that he enjoyed hiking and wrote about in his diary, including while working on Op. 22.) first flora, primroses, anemones, pasqueflowers)", for example. Studying his compositional materials and sketches, Bailey Puffett wrote that Webern seemed to labor over his musical structures in order "to reveal wonderful surprises ... [like] he found on his walks in the Alps".

In composing the Concerto for Nine Instruments, Op. 24 (1931–1934), Webern drew on the Sator square, which has been associated with the microcosm–macrocosm analogy ("as above, so below") and the proverb "as you sow, so shall you reap". He may have known Isaac pupil Ludwig Senfl's "Salve sancta parens" (1520), a riddle canon linked to magic squares, including this one. The square's mirror symmetries have been compared to musical matrices (often of pitches), and Webern sketched a derived row to help establish structural correspondences (or isomorphism) between its ambigrams (read boustrophedon) and his own musical permutations, including of melodic motion, likely hoping to make the square's evocation of cosmic unity audible. He concluded The Path to the New Music (1932–1933) with the square, describing his tone rows as governed by "certain secret laws", a phrase that has been related to Rudolf Steiner's interpretation of Goethe's view of art as revealing the universe's divine order. (Note: For Steiner, who founded Anthroposophy, Goethe was the father of a new science of aesthetics.)

In Webern's late cantatas and songs, (Note: viz. the Drei Gesänge, Op. 23; Drei Lieder, Op. 25; Das Augenlicht, Op. 26; Cantata No. 1, Op. 29; and Cantata No. 2, Op. 31) George Rochberg observed, "the principles of 'the structural spatial dimension' ... join[ed] forces with lyrico-dramatic demands". Specifically in his cantatas, Bailey Puffett wrote, Webern synthesized the rigorous style of his mature instrumental works with the word painting of his Lieder on an orchestral scale. Webern qualified the apparent connection between his cantatas and Bach's as general and referred to connections between the second cantata and the music of the Franco-Flemish School. His textures became somewhat denser yet more homophonic at the surface through nonetheless contrapuntal polyphonic means. In Op. 31/i he alternated lines and points, culminating twice (Note: First by hexachordal aggregation in its center; second in a registrally expansive, open voicing at the end.) in twelve-note simultaneities.

At his death he left sketches for the movement of an apparent third cantata (1944–1945), first planned as a concerto, setting "Das Sonnenlicht spricht" from Jone's Lumen cycle.

=== Arrangements and orchestrations ===
In his youth (1903), Webern orchestrated five or more Schubert Lieder for an appropriately Schubertian orchestra (strings and pairs of flutes, oboes, clarinets, bassoons, and horns). Among these were "Der Vollmond Strahlt auf Bergeshöhn" (the Romanze from Rosamunde), "Tränenregen" (from Die schöne Müllerin), "Der Wegweiser" (from Winterreise), "Du bist die Ruh", and "Ihr Bild". After attending Hugo Wolf's funeral and memorial concert (1903), he arranged three Lieder for a larger orchestra, adding brass, harp, and percussion to the Schubertian orchestra. He chose "Lebe wohl", "Der Knabe und das Immlein", and "Denk es, o Seele", of which only the latter was finished or wholly survived.

In orchestrating the six-voice ricercar from Bach's Musical Offering, Webern timbrally defined the internal organization (or latent subsets) of the Bach's subject. Joseph N. Straus argued that Webern (and other modernists) effectively recomposed earlier music, "projecting motivic density" onto tradition. After more conservatively orchestrating two of Schubert's 1824 Six German Dances on U.E. commission in 1931, he wrote Schoenberg that he "took pains to remain on the solid ground of classical ideas of instrumentation, yet to place them into the service of our idea, i.e., as a means toward the greatest possible clarification of thought and context."

== Reception, influence, and legacy ==
Webern's music was generally considered difficult by performers and inaccessible by listeners. "To the limited extent that it was regarded", Milton Babbitt observed, it represented "the ultimate in hermetic, specialized, and idiosyncratic composition".

Composers and performers first tended to take Webern's work, with its residual post-Romanticism and initial expressionism, in mostly formalist directions with a certain literalism, departing from Webern's own practices and preferences in extrapolating from elements of his late style. This became known as post-Webernism. A richer, more historically informed understanding of Webern's music and his performance practice began to emerge in the latter half of the 20th century as scholars, especially the Moldenhauers, sought and archived sketches, letters, lectures, recordings, and other articles of Webern's (and others') estates. (Note: In 2013, the Moldenhauers' dogged investigation into Webern's death and the experiences and testimony of those involved were portrayed in a one-act opera, The Death of Webern, which, though written in the eclectic style of its composer Michael Dellaira, paraphrases and quotes from Webern's music (e.g., the Passacaglia, Op. 1 in the third and final scenes, Klangfarbenmelodie in the sixth scene).)

In the immediate aftermath of World War II, Webern's marginalization under Gleichschaltung was appreciated, but his pan-Germanism, politics, and social attitudes (especially regarding antisemitism) were not as known or often mooted. Later, his pan-German sympathies with Nazism became a sensation in his reception in ways prone to oversimplification and decontextualization, and were sometimes used to politicize his music and its language absent certainty. (Note: Schoenberg's life and music have also been simplified and decontextualized in reception narratives that isolate aspects to fit specific theses, using him as a tool for controversy.) For many, like Stravinsky, Webern never compromised his artistic identity and values, but for others later, the matter was less simple. (Note: For example, the BACH motif of Op. 28 (1938) troubled some, like Taruskin and Sebastian Wedler, as did Op. 29 (1938–1939, orch. 1944).)

=== Performance practice ===
Eric Simon ... related ... : 'Webern was obviously upset by Klemperer's sober time-beating. ... [T]o the concert master [he] said: "... the phrase there ... must be played Tiiiiiiiiiii-aaaaaaaaa." Klemperer, overhearing ... said sarcastically: "... [N]ow you probably know exactly how you have to play the passage!"' Peter Stadlen ... [described Webern]'s reaction after the performance: ... '"A high note, a low note, a note in the middle—like the music of a madman!"'

— The Moldenhauers detailed Webern's reaction to Otto Klemperer's 1936 Vienna performance of his Symphony (1928), Op. 21, which Webern played on piano for Klemperer "with ... intensity and fanaticism ... passionately".

Webern notated articulations, dynamics, tempo rubato, and other musical expressions, coaching performers to adhere to these instructions but urging them to maximize expressivity through musical phrasing. (Note: See Werktreue.) This was supported by personal accounts, letters, and extant recordings of Schubert's Deutsche Tänze (arr. Webern) and Berg's Violin Concerto under Webern's direction. Ian Pace considered Peter Stadlen's account of Webern's coaching for Op. 27 as indicating Webern's "desire for an extremely flexible, highly diaphanous, and almost expressively overloaded approach". (Note: Stadlen published a specially marked score.)

This aspect of Webern's work was often overlooked in his immediate post-war reception, which was roughly coterminous with the early music revival. Stravinsky engaged with Webern and Renaissance music in his later music; his amanuensis Craft performed Webern as well as Monteverdi, Schütz, Gabrieli, and Tallis. Many musicians performed "music that is at the same time old and new", as Nicholas Cook and Anthony Pople glossed it and as Richard Taruskin addressed. J. Peter Burkholder noted early and new music audience overlap.

Felix Galimir of the Galimir Quartet told The New York Times (1981): "Berg asked for enormous correctness in the performance of his music. But the moment this was achieved, he asked for a very Romanticized treatment. Webern, you know, was also terribly Romantic—as a person, and when he conducted. Everything was almost over-sentimentalized. It was entirely different from what we have been led to believe today. His music should be played very freely, very emotionally."

=== Contemporaries ===
==== Artists ====
Many artists portrayed Webern (often from life) in their work. Kokoschka (1912), Schiele (1917 and 1918), B. F. Dolbin (1920 and 1924), and Rederer (1934) made drawings of him. Oppenheimer (1908), Kokoschka (1914), and Tom von Dreger (1934) painted him. Stumpp made two lithographs of him (1927). Humplik twice sculpted him (1927 and 1928). Jone variously portrayed him (1943 lithograph, several posthumous drawings, 1945 oil painting). Rederer made a large woodcut of him (1964).

==== Musicians ====
Schoenberg admired Webern's concision, writing in the foreword to Op. 9 upon its 1924 publication: "to express a novel in a single gesture, joy in a single breath—such concentration can only be present in proportion to the absence of self-indulgence". But Berg joked about Webern's brevity. Hendrik Andriessen found Webern's music "pitiful" in this regard. In their second (1925) Abbruch (Note: Cancellation) self-parody, Anbruch (Note: Dawn) editors jested that "Webern's" (Mahler's) "extensive" Symphony of a Thousand had to be abbreviated. (Note: German Wikisource has original text related to this article: Musikblätter des Anbruch.)

Felix Khuner remembered Webern was "just as revolutionary" as Schoenberg. In 1927, Hans Mersmann wrote that "Webern's music shows the frontiers and ... limits of a development which tried to outgrow Schoenberg's work."

Identifying with Webern as a "solitary soul" amid 1940s wartime fascism, Dallapiccola independently and somewhat singularly (Note: Goffredo Petrassi and his student Aldo Clementi were later influenced by Webern, as was Schoenberg pupil Alfredo Sangiorgi. Riccardo Malipiero organized composers, including Camillo Togni, around twelve-tone music in 1949 Milan.) found inspiration especially in Webern's lesser-known mid-period Lieder, blending its ethereal qualities and Viennese expressionism with bel canto. Stunned by Webern's Op. 24 at its 1935 ISCM festival world première under Jalowetz in Prague, Dallapiccola's impression was of unsurpassable "aesthetic and stylistic unity". He dedicated Sex carmina alcaei (Note: Dallapiccola's 1943 Sex carmina alcaei, on some of the Lirici greci of Salvatore Quasimodo after Alcaeus of Mytilene, were one of three groups of Lieder from his Liriche greche set (1942–1945).) "with humility and devotion" to Webern, who he met in 1942 through Schlee, coming away surprised at Webern's emphasis on "our great Central European tradition." Dallapiccola's 1953 Goethe-lieder especially recall Webern's Op. 16 in style.

In 1947, Schoenberg remembered and stood firm with Berg and Webern despite rumors of the latter's having "fallen into the Nazi trap": (Note: This is Krasner's phrase, by which he interpreted Schoenberg's "those who tried might have succeeded in confounding us" as referring to Webern. But Douglas Jarman noted Schoenberg's discomfort with and Stein's (and later Cerha's and Perle's) defense of Berg after the Jewish banker scene in Act III of Lulu. When Schoenberg asked Webern about his feelings toward the Nazis, Webern replied, "Who dares to come between you and me?" When Steuermann asked Krasner on behalf of Schoenberg, Krasner soothed Schoenberg with a self-described lie. Schoenberg's 1934 (or 1935)–1936 Violin Concerto kept its dedication to Webern, though worded very simply ("to Anton von Webern"), whether due to Schoenberg's suspicions or to protect Webern from danger or Nazi suspicion. Schoenberg and Webern continued to correspond at least through 1939.) "... [F]orget all that might have ... divided us. For there remains for our future what could only have begun to be realized posthumously: One will have to consider us three—Berg, Schoenberg, and Webern—as a unity, a oneness, because we believed in ideals ... with intensity and selfless devotion; nor would we ever have been deterred from them, even if those who tried might have succeeded in confounding us." (Note: Schoenberg prepared his statement for publication as a handwritten inscription by facsimile reproduction in Leibowitz's 1948 didactic score of Webern's then unpublished Op. 24, which Webern dedicated to Schoenberg in 1934 for his sixtieth birthday.) For Krasner this put "'Vienna's Three Modern Classicists' into historical perspective". He summarized it as "what bound us together was our idealism."

=== 1947–1950s: (Re)discovery and post-Webernism ===
Webern's death should be a day of mourning for any receptive musician. We must hail ... this great ... a real hero. Doomed to ... failure in a deaf world of ignorance and indifference he ... kept on cutting ... dazzling diamonds, the mines of which he had ... perfect knowledge.

— Stravinsky lauded Webern in die Reihe (Note: Or possibly Craft, who often ghostwrote for Stravinsky.)

After World War II, there was unprecedented engagement with Webern's music. It came to represent a universally or generally valid, systematic, and compellingly logical model of new composition, especially at the Darmstädter Ferienkurse. René Leibowitz performed, promulgated, and published Schoenberg et son école; Adorno, Herbert Eimert, Scherchen, and others contributed. Composers and students (Note: See Darmstadt School.) listened in a quasi-religious trance to Peter Stadlen's 1948 Op. 27 performance.

Webern's gradual innovations in schematic organization of pitch, rhythm, register, timbre, dynamics, articulation, and melodic contour; his generalization of imitative techniques such as canon and fugue; and his inclination toward athematicism, abstraction, and lyricism variously informed and oriented European and Canadian, typically serial or avant-garde composers (e.g., Messiaen, Boulez, Stockhausen, Luigi Nono, Pousseur, Ligeti, Sylvano Bussotti, Bruno Maderna, Bernd Alois Zimmermann, Barbara Pentland). Eimert and Stockhausen devoted a special issue of die Reihe to Webern's œuvre in 1955. U.E. published his lectures in 1960.

In the US, Babbitt and initially Rochberg found more in Schoenberg's twelve-tone practice. Elliott Carter's and Aaron Copland's critical ambivalence was marked by a certain enthusiasm and fascination nonetheless. Craft fruitfully reintroduced Stravinsky to Webern's music, without which Stravinsky's late works would have taken different shape. Stravinsky staked his contract with Columbia Records to see Webern's then known music first both recorded and widely distributed. Stravinsky lauded Webern's "not yet canonized art" in 1959.

Among the New York School, John Cage and Morton Feldman first met in Carnegie Hall's lobby, ecstatic after a performance of Op. 21 by Dimitri Mitropoulos and the New York Philharmonic. They cited the effect of its sound on their music. They later sung the praises of Christian Wolff as "our Webern".

Gottfried Michael Koenig suggested some early interest in Webern's music may have been that its concision and apparent simplicity facilitated didactic musical analysis. Robert Beyer criticized serial approaches to Webern's music as reductive, narrowly focused more on Webern's procedures than his music while neglecting timbre in their typical selection of Opp. 27–28. Webern's music sounded like "a Mondrian canvas", "crude and unfinished", to Karel Goeyvaerts. Wolf-Eberhard von Lewinski criticized some Darmstadt music as "acoustically absurd [if] visually amusing" (Darmstädter Tagblatt, 1959); a Der Kurier article of his was headlined "Meager modern music—only interesting to look at".

=== 1950s onward: Beyond (late) Webern ===
[H]ermetic constructivism seems infused with intense emotion, ... diffused across the ... surface of the music. Gone is the mono-directional thrust of Classical and Romantic music; in its place a world of rotations and reflections, opening myriad paths for the listener to trace through textures of luminous clarity yet beguiling ambiguity.

— George Benjamin described Webern's Op. 21. Many (Note: Among these were Feldman, Pousseur, (Note: See Scambi, 1957.) Rochberg, Stravinsky, and La Monte Young.) noted floating, spatial, static, or suspended qualities in some of Webern's music. Johnson noted spatial metaphors.

Through late 1950s onward, Webern's work reached musicians as far removed as Frank Zappa, yet many post-war European musicians and scholars had already begun to look beyond as much as back at Webern in his context. Nono advocated for a more humanistic understanding of Webern's music.

Adorno lectured that in the prevailing climate "artists like Berg or Webern would hardly be able to make it" ("The Aging of the New Music", 1954). Against the "static idea of music" and "total rationalization" of the "pointillist constructivists", he advocated for more subjectivity, citing Über das Geistige in der Kunst (1911), in which Wassily Kandinsky wrote: "Schoenberg's [expressionist] music leads us to where musical experience is a matter not of the ear, but of the soul—and from this point begins the music of the future."

In the 1960s, many began to describe Webern and his like as a "dead end". (Note: Olin Downes described Op. 28 as "Dead End music" in 1941. Another critic wrote in 1929: "If modernism depended for progress upon the Weberns, it would get nowhere.") Rochberg felt "Webern's music leaves his followers no new, unexplored territory." Stravinsky judged Webern "too original ... too purely himself. ... [T]he entire world had to imitate him [and] fail; of course it will blame Webern"; he blamed post-Webernism: "[T]he music now being charged to his name can neither diminish his strength nor stale his perfection."

In Votre Faust (1960–1968), Pousseur quoted and his protagonist Henri analyzed Webern's Op. 31. Yet there were already several elements of late or postmodernism (e.g., eclecticism of historical styles, mobile form, polyvalent roles). This coincided with a wider rapprochement with Berg, whose example Pousseur cited, from whose music he also quoted, and whose writings he translated into French in the 1950s. Boulez was "thrilled" by Berg's "universe ... never completed, always in expansion—a world so ... inexhaustible", referring to the rigorously organized, only partly twelve-tone Chamber Concerto. (Note: Adorno advocated for the completion of Lulu, writing that it "reveals the extent of its quality the longer and more deeply one immerses oneself in it". Boulez conducted the 1979 première after Cerha's orchestration.)

Engaging with Webern's atonal works by some contrast to earlier post-Webernism, both Ferneyhough and Lachenmann expanded upon and went further than Webern in attention to the smallest of details and the use of ever more radically extended techniques. Ferneyhough's 1967 Sonatas for string quartet included atonal sections much in the style of Webern's Op. 9, yet more intensely sustained. In a comparison to his own 1969 Air, Lachenmann wrote of "a melody made of a single note ... in the viola part" of Webern's Op. 10/iv (mm. 2–4) amid "the mere ruins of the traditional linguistic context", observing that "the pure tone, now living in tonal exile, has in this new context no aesthetic advantage over pure noise" ("Hearing [Hören] is Defenseless—without Listening [Hören]", 1985).

=== Eastern Europe ===
In Eastern Europe, the Second Viennese School's music represented a professionally dangerous but sometimes exciting or inspiring alternative to socialist realism. Their influence on composers behind the Iron Curtain was mediated by anti-fascist and -German sentiment as well as anti-formalist cultural policies and Cold War separation. (Note: By contrast, the Kolisch Quartet's 1927 performance of Berg's Lyric Suite at the Baden-Baden ISCM festival (where Bartók performed his own Piano Sonata) inspired Bartók in his subsequent third and fourth string quartets and Concerto for Orchestra.) Ligeti lamented the separation and left in 1956, noting that "after Bartók hardly any grass could grow".

==== Eastern Bloc ====
Webern's influence predominated after the Hungarian Revolution of 1956, bearing on Pál Kadosa, Endre Szervánszky, and György Kurtág. Among Czechs, Pavel Blatný attended the Darmstädter Ferienkurse and wrote music with serial techniques in the late 1960s. He returned to tonality in Brno and was rewarded. Marek Kopelent discovered the Second Viennese as an editor and was particularly taken by Webern. Kopelent was blacklisted for his music and despaired, unable to attend international performances of his work.

==== Soviet Russia ====
Official Soviet Russian condemnation eased in the post-Stalinist Khrushchev Thaw, and some affected by the Zhdanov Doctrine enjoyed rehabilitation. Sheet music and recordings entered through journalists, friends, family (as from Nicolas to Sergei Slonimsky), and composers and touring musicians (e.g., Igor Blazhkov, Gérard Frémy, Alexei Lubimov, Maria Yudina). Stationed in Zossen as a military band arranger (1955–1958), Yuri Kholopov risked arrest for obtaining scores in West Berlin and from the Leipzig office of Schott Music.

Webern pupil Philip Herschkowitz, poverty-stricken, taught privately in Moscow with cautious emphasis on Beethoven and the tradition from which Webern emerged. His pupil Nikolai Karetnikov taped Glenn Gould's 1957 Moscow Conservatory performance of Webern's Op. 27. In practice like that of Webern, Karetnikov derived the tone row of his Symphony No. 4 from motives as small as two notes related by semitone.

In Soviet Music, Marcel Rubin criticized "Webern and His Followers" (1959), by contrast to Berg and Schoenberg, for going too far. Through Grigory Shneyerson's anti-formalist On Music Living and Dead (1960) and Johannes Paul Thilman's anti-modernist "On the Dodecaphonic Method of Composition" (1958), many (e.g., Eduard Artemyev, Victor Ekimovsky, Vladimir Martynov, Boris Tischenko (Note: Tischenko's anti-Stalinist Requiem is a noted example of Soviet post-Webernism.)) ironically learned more about what had been and even was still forbidden. Alfred Schnittke complained in an open letter (1961) of composers' restricted education. Kruschchev warned, "dodecaphonic music, music of noises ... this cacophonic music we totally reject. Our people cannot include such trash".

Through Andrei Volkonsky, Lydia Davydova recalled, Schoenberg's and Webern's music came to Russia alongside Renaissance and early Baroque music. Tischenko remembered that in the 1960s, Volkonsky "was the first swallow of the avant-garde. [T]hose who came after him ... already followed in his tracks. I consider [him] the discoverer." Edison Denisov described the 1960s as his "second conservatory", crediting Volkonsky not only for introducing Webern, but also Gesualdo.

This tolerance did not survive the Brezhnev Stagnation. Volkonsky emigrated in 1973, Herschkowitz in 1987, and of Khrennikov's Seven (1979), Denisov, Elena Firsova, Sofia Gubaidulina, Dmitri Smirnov, and Viktor Suslin eventually emigrated.

=== Dance ===
Many choreographers set Webern's music to dance. Martha Graham and George Balanchine choreographed several works in Episodes I and II respectively (1959) as a New York City Ballet "novelty". John Cranko set Opus 1 (1965) to Webern's Passacaglia, Op. 1. Rudi van Dantzig choreographed Webern's music in Ogenblikken (Note: Moments) (1968) and Antwoord gevend (Note: Giving Answer) (1980); Glen Tetley in Praeludium (1978) and Contredanses (1979); Anne Teresa De Keersmaeker alongside that of Beethoven and Schnittke in Erts (1992); and Trisha Brown in Twelve Ton Rose (1996). Jiří Kylián set only Webern's music in No More Play (1988) and Sweet Dreams (1990), more often pairing it with that of other composers in several ballets (1984–1995).

=== Since the 1980s: Reappraisals and historiography ===
==== Contested canonization ====
Webern's legacy, contested in the "serial wars", remained subject to polemic vicissitudes. Musicologists quarreled (Note: Robert Fink described a "general disciplinary crisis". In new musicology and postmodernism, canons were questioned, and pluralism was promoted. Lawrence Kramer and Susan McClary emphasized musical meaning. Taruskin criticized the canon's Eurocentrism, Germanism (especially in Schoenberg's, Webern's, and Dahlhaus's work), and colonialism.) amid the "Restoration of the 1980s", as Martin Kaltenecker termed a paradigm shift from structure to perception within musicological discourse. (Note: Johnson also described several shifts.) Charles Rosen scorned "historical criticism ... avoiding any serious engagement with a work or style ... one happens not to like". Andreas Holzer warned of "post-factual tendencies". (Note: In relation to post-Webernism more generally, Holzer slammed attempts "to place Darmstadt in a fascistoid corner or even identifying it as a U.S. propaganda institution amid the Cold War" ("Darmstadt in ein 'faschistoides' Eck zu stellen oder es gar als Propagandainstitution der USA im Kalten Krieg auszuweisen") via "unbelievable distortions, exaggerations, reductions and propagation of clichés" ("unglaublichen Verdrehungen, Übertreibungen, Verkürzungen und Propagierungen von Klischeebildern").) Pamela M. Potter advised considering "the complexity of ... day-to-day existence" under Nazism, partly in considering the relevance of composers' politics to their canonic status. Meanwhile Allen Forte and Bailey Puffett formally analyzed Webern's atonal and twelve-tone œuvres respectively.

By Webern's 1983 birth centenary, his work was being read less formally. That year, his entire œuvre was played at the Venice Festival of Contemporary Music. In the US, Glenn Watkins wrote that Webern's mid-century "meteoric ascension and ultimate canonization" had stalled, resulting in relative neglect. Nonetheless, Webern's entire œuvre was featured at Juilliard in 1995 and again in Europe at the Vienna Festival in 2004, echoing six international festivals dedicated to his music between 1962 and 1978. His music was established but infrequent in standard (repeating) orchestral repertoire. (Note: Surveying institutions and performers, Ian Pace described New Music and its performance institutions as subcultural within classical music. In a survey of five prestigious British and French orchestras, Webern's music was played 121 times and Beethoven's 1,198 times between 1967 and 2017. In a U.S.–orchestra survey of the "top 100 composers in terms of works performed", his music was played 175 times and Mozart's 7,103 times between 2000 and 2009.) In some obscurity in 1941 or 1942, Webern had been quietly sure that "in the future even the postman will whistle my melodies!" But many did not acquire such an aesthetic taste, (Note: "[A]tonal music is [like] random notes" in its macroharmony, Dmitri Tymoczko suggested as one reason. Building on Tymoczko's work, Joshua Ballance described Webern's Opp. 1–31 partly in its macroharmonies, emphasizing the already totally chromatic macroharmonies of the pre-dodecaphonic mid-period Lieder. J. Kramer believed such music as Webern's required the listener to learn more about it in order to understand it and wrote that only some listeners did. In this sense, he wrote, it is elitist music. While he asserted that Schoenberg and Stravinsky were "generally understood to be well within the cultural mainstream" by contrast to avant-garde radicals like Satie, Henry Cowell, or Luigi Russolo, he considered that Ives and Webern straddled radical and progressive sensibilities. He also wrote that modernism fared better in Europe than in the US, which he ascribed to differences in education and also to the commercialization of increasingly unsubsidized art music particularly in the US.) and his music remained challenging for many listeners. (Note: J. Kramer wrote that audiences gradually became less shocked and more indifferent, at least in the US.)

Noting this aspect of his reception, Johnson described Webern's "almost unique position in the canon of Western composers". Christian Thorau argued Webern's innovations impeded his "exoteric" canonization. By contrast to the "concert canon", Anne C. Shreffler considered Webern's better standing in a "separate canon" of technical and formal innovation. (Note: "Don't write music entirely by ear", Webern told Searle: "Your ears will always guide you ... but you must know why" (emphasis in original). Webern's music was associated with "intellectual order". He innovated musically and conceptually, challenging audiences. Julian Johnson argued that criticisms of composers' innovations were a "constant of musical modernity for four hundred years", from il nuove musiche to die neue Musik. He quoted Girolamo Mei writing to Vincenzo Galilei in 1572: "[N]ot to appear ... inferior ... these musicians precipitated themselves at breakneck speed ... to discover always new styles and new forms of song [which] were not understood [or] felt". Mei wrote Galilei that in these innovations composers followed their ears, not their intellects.) David H. Miller suggested Webern "achieved a certain kind of acceptance and canonization". Mark Berry described Webern, already among Boulez's "big five", as one of five "canonical pillars of classic historical early twentieth-century modernism". (Note: The others, in both cases, were Bartók, Berg, Schoenberg, and Stravinsky. In Joseph N. Straus's account of how modernists recast tradition, they were "the exemplars" on whom he focused. Ensemble intercontemporain played them often at Boulez's IRCAM as "classics" in the 1980s, which Georgina Born argued contributed to their canonization. In considering the U.S. context, J. Kramer wrote that Bartók, Stravinsky, and especially Schoenberg and Webern were not often played or widely understood but nonetheless backed as central to canon of 20th-century classical music in terms of theory and analysis by academics with a shared perspective (who constituted a significant plurality of composers). He considered Schoenberg, Stravinsky, and Webern "quintessential modernists of the early twentieth century".) Burkholder argued that music of the "historicist tradition", (Note: For J. Peter Burkholder, musical historicism as a mainstream intellectual tradition proper began in Brahms's generation's l'art pour l'art and more introverted musical experience. It intensified in Schoenberg's generation with increasing engagement with stylistic history as impetus to compositional innovation. Distantly and obliquely echoing Charles Burney's work, it flowered amid Hegelianism and theories of biological and social evolution or progress. Burkholder distinguished between more progressive historicism (Schoenberg's Erwartung), more emulative cases (Strauss's Ariadne auf Naxos), and mixed examples (Berg's Wozzeck). He noted the assimilation of peripheral national music traditions for novelty but emphasized that innovation occurred even within those contexts.) including Webern's, was secure in "a musical museum", while adding, "that is what the concert hall has become". (Note: Burkholder and Lydia Goehr, among others, traced the history of orchestras' (and other institutions') museum-like function in producing and presenting "civilized", "elite", or "important" (if sometimes "difficult", "serious", or "unpopular") music as artwork, not without regard to audiences.)

Taruskin prioritized audience reception, not "musical utopianism". (Note: For Taruskin, pitch sets did not "conform to the physics of sound", and "optimism about human adaptability ... is the same ... that drives all utopian thinking.") He excoriated the Second Viennese School's "idiosyncratic view of the past", linking Webern and Adler to Eduard Hanslick and "neo-Hegelian" Franz Brendel; (Note: J. Kramer characterized early modernists (e.g., Schoenberg, Stravinsky, and Webern) and even the early modernist avant-garde (e.g., Satie, Cowell, Russolo, Edgar Varèse) as "trapped" in continuous historical development. Seeing themselves as innovators entailed both conceiving of history as linear progress and rejecting prior concepts of music, he explained. Modernists engaged and competed with the dominant music of the past, which they reinvented.) he criticized historical determinism, "the natural ally of totalitarian politics." Martin Scherzinger wrote that Taruskin's criticisms sought "active complicity with undesirable politics". (Note: For Taruskin, "the legacy of fascism is an inseparable ... facet of the lofty legacy of modernism". Krasner told Fanfare Webern "packed me off quickly" upon the Anschluss "for my safety but perhaps ... to avoid ... embarrassment ... had his family arrived, or friends celebrating ... Nazi entry". Taruskin cited Krasner to claim Webern joyfully welcomed the Nazis upon the Anschluss. In his "How Talented Composers Become Useless" postscript, Taruskin wrote, "The Nazis had every right to criticize Schoenberg ... . It is not for their criticism that we all revile them." He compared Leibowitz to Goebbels, found "Nazi resonances" in Eimert's "only composers who follow Webern are worthy of the name", and likened Boulez's "[s]ince the Viennese discoveries, any musician who has not experienced ... the necessity of dodecaphonic language is USELESS" to the Zhdanov Doctrine.) Noted for his polemicism and revisionism, (Note: "Of all in the volumes in this series", Taruskin referred to his Oxford History, "this one, covering the first half of the twentieth century, surely differs the most radically from previous accounts".) Taruskin described his "dubious reputation" on Webern and New Music and was praised and criticized (Note: Rosen charged Taruskin's "hostile presentation ... does not result in historical objectivity". Max Erwin considered Taruskin's work on the Darmstädter Ferienkurse "passionately negative" and "thoroughly discredited", particularly that "Adorno or Leibowitz officiated with near-dictatorial power". Rodney Lister wrote, "Taruskin's purpose ... is to bury Webern, not to praise him", noting "the increasing importance of 'motivization' over the course of the 19th century and of the 'collapse' of (traditional) tonality [is] something which Taruskin flatly states never took place." Larson Powell found "Taruskin's ... references to Webern's politics ... to discredit the music". Christian Utz agreed with Martin Zenck that Taruskin's claims were "simplifying and distorting", granting "authoritarian rhetoric ... in ... the 1950s and 60s" and the nonexistence of "'apolitical music'". Holzer also sympathized with but found Taruskin inappropriate and simplistic.) by many. For Franklin Cox, Taruskin was an unreliable historian who opposed the Second Viennese School's "progressivist historicist" emancipation of the dissonance with a "reactionary historicist" ideology of "tonal restoration".

==== Historical continuities ====
Pascal Decroupet observed an unquestioned "canon of polarizations" in prior histories. (Note: In a case study, Martin Kaltenecker noted Taruskin's taking aim at avant-garde prestige in opposition to Célestin Deliège's Cinquante ans de modernité musicale: De Darmstadt à l'IRCAM. He contrasted their polarized nomothetic "plots" with more idiographic approaches' "juxtapositions" and thick description. He considered how to move beyond this nomothetic–idiographic historiographical dichotomy.) Johnson noted the "co-existence and interaction of diverse stylistic practices" with "remarkable similarities", challenging "conservative and progressive" campism and setting musicology's technical periodizations within the longue durée of global modernity. (Note: Johnson described music in modernity as "broken off from the past", "broken in itself", and "of individual subjectivity". It no longer "elaborate[s] ... divine unity", by contrast to medieval music, but "rema[d]e it", he argued, "as Wagner's Siegfried ... from ... his father's sword, or as Webern piece[d] together ... atomized ... interval[s]".) He ventured continuity between the "broken homeland" of Webern's Opp. 12–18 and the "broken pastoral" of Monteverdi's L'Orfeo and Vaughan Williams' Pastoral Symphony, (Note: For Johnson, modernism foregrounded the "brokenness that always lay at the heart of the pastoral". Thomas Peattie wrote about brokenness in Mahler's pastoral music.) and between Webern's "evanescent images of musical fullness" and Chopin's brief, fragmentary Op. 28, likened to ruins by Schumann.

Building on Shreffler's and Felix Meyer's work, including sketch studies, as institutions like the Paul-Sacher-Stiftung acquired and made the Moldenhauers' estate accessible, (Note: Julie Brown described a "greening" of Webern literature in the 1990s.) Johnson noted Webern's concern for the relation between form and content, (Note: In 1912, Webern wrote that Schoenberg's music "creates entirely new expressive values; therefore it also needs new means of expression". "Content and form", he continued, "cannot be separated." The Moldenhauers wrote that "Webern's remarks ... could readily serve as commentaries on his own compositions".) and pursued a hermeneutics of Webern's and Mahler's music. He argued that Webern, following Mahler, fundamentally treated nature not only as something to be expressed or to represented, but also as a deeper formal principle or structural model, yielding inseparably richer musical expression.

Wedler argued by antinomy and demythologization that the complex, seemingly contradictory reception of Webern and his music stemmed from this unity of opposites imaginatively mediated within Webern's underlying aesthetic of musical lyricism (or musical poetry, as Schoenberg called it). Adorno termed it "absolute lyricism", perhaps (Wedler suggested) after Hegel, who saw concentration as the lyric's essence, permitting "the greatest wealth of steps and nuances" to dialectically resolve the dilemma between "almost dumb conciseness" and "the eloquent clarity of a [fully developed] idea".

== Recordings by Webern ==
- Webern Conducts: Berg – Violin Concerto. Continuum. 1991 [1936]. ASIN B000003XHN. OCLC 25348107. SBT 1004.
- The Complete Works of Anton Webern. CBS Records. 1978. ASIN B000002707. OCLC 612743015.
  - Webern conducts his arrangement of Schubert's German Dances

== See also ==
- List of Austrians in music
