= List of compositions by Alban Berg =

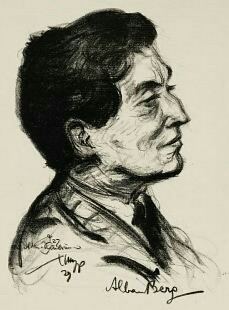
Sketch of Alban Berg by Emil Stumpp

The following is an incomplete list of the compositions of Alban Berg:

- Jugendlieder (1), composed 1901–4, voice and piano, published 1985
1. "Herbstgefühl" (Siegfried Fleischer)
2. "Spielleute" (Henrik Ibsen)
3. "Wo der Goldregen steht" (Felix Lorenz)
4. "Lied der Schiffermädels" (Otto Julius Bierbaum)
5. "Sehnsucht" I (Paul Hohenberg)
6. "Abschied" (Elimar von Monsterberg-Muenckenau)
7. "Grenzen der Menschheit" (Johann Wolfgang von Goethe)
8. "Vielgeliebte schöne Frau" (Heinrich Heine)
9. "Sehnsucht" II (Heinrich Heine)
10. "Sternefall" (Karl Wilhelm)
11. "Sehnsucht" III (Paul Hohenberg)
12. "Ich liebe dich!" (Christian Dietrich Grabbe)
13. "Ferne Lieder" (Friedrich Rückert)
14. "Ich will die Fluren meiden" (Friedrich Rückert)
15. "Geliebte Schöne" (Heinrich Heine)
16. "Schattenleben" (Martin Greif)
17. "Am Abend" (Emanuel Geibel)
18. "Vorüber!" (Franz Wisbacher)
19. "Schummerlose Nächte" (Martin Greif)
20. "Es wandelt, was wir schauen (Joseph von Eichendorff)
21. "Liebe (Rainer Maria Rilke)
22. "Im Morgengrauen (Karl Stieler)
23. "Grabschrift (Ludwig Jakobowski)
- Jugendlieder (2), composed 1904–8, voice and piano, published 1985
1. "Traum" (Frida Semler)
2. "Augenblicke" (Robert Hamerling)
3. "Die Näherin" (Rainer Maria Rilke)
4. "Erster Verlust" (Johann Wolfgang von Goethe)
5. "Süss sind mir die Schollen des Tales" (Karl Ernst Knodt)
6. "Er klagt das der Frühling so kortz blüht" (Arno Holz)
7. "Tiefe Sehnsucht" (Detlev von Liliencron)
8. "Über den Bergen" (Karl Busse)
9. "Am Strande" (Georg Scherer)
10. "Winter" (Johannes Schlaf)
11. "Fraue, du Süsse" (Ludwig Finckh)
12. "Verlassen" (Bohemian folksong)
13. "Regen" (Johannes Schlaf)
14. "Traurigkeit" (Peter Altenberg)
15. "Hoffnung" (Peter Altenberg)
16. "Flötenspielerin" (Peter Altenberg)
17. "Spaziergang" (Alfred Mombert)
18. "Eure Weisheit" (Johann Georg Fischer)
19. "So regnet es sich langsam ein" (Cäsar Flaischlein)
20. "Mignon" (Johann Wolfgang von Goethe)
21. "Die Sorglichen" (Gustav Falke)
22. "Das stille Königreich" (Karl Busse)
23. "An Leukon" (Johann Wilhelm Ludwig Gleim)
- Seven Early Songs, voice and piano, composed 1905–8, revised and orchestrated 1928
1. "Nacht" (Carl Hauptmann)
2. "Schilflied" (Nikolaus Lenau)
3. "Die Nachtigall" (Theodor Storm)
4. "Traumgekrönt" (Rainer Maria Rilke)
5. "Im Zimmer" (Johannes Schlaf)
6. "Liebesode" (Otto Erich Hartleben)
7. "Sommertage" (Paul Hohenberg)
- Schliesse mir die Augen beide (Theodor Storm), voice and piano, composed 1907, published in 1930 & 1955
- An Leukon (Johann Wilhelm Ludwig Gleim), voice and piano, composed 1908; published in 1937 & 1963 (Reich) & 1985 (UE) (2 versions exist: in G minor [1907]; in E minor [1908])
- Frühe Klaviermusik, published 1989
- Zwölf Variationen über ein eigenes Thema in C, piano, composed Nov. 8, 1908; published in 1957 & 1985
- Symphony and Passacaglia, fragment, composed 1913
- Piano Sonata, Op. 1, composed 1907–8, published April 24, 1911
- Vier Lieder, Op. 2, voice and piano, composed 1909–10, published 1910
1. "Schlafen, schlafen" (Friedrich Hebbel)
2. "Schlafend trägt man mich" (Alfred Mombert)
3. "Nun ich der Riesen Stärksten" (Alfred Mombert)
4. "Warm die Lüfte" (Alfred Mombert)
- String Quartet, Op. 3, composed 1910, published 1920
- Fünf Orchesterlieder nach Ansichtkartentexten von Peter Altenberg, Op. 4, soprano and orchestra, 1912 (Altenberg Lieder)
1. "Seele, wie bist du schöner"
2. "Sahst du nach dem Gewitterregen"
3. "Über die Grenzen des All"
4. "Nichts ist gekommen"
5. "Hier ist Friede"
- Vier Stücke, Op. 5, clarinet and piano, composed 1913, published 1920
1. Mäßig
2. Sehr langsam
3. Sehr rasch
4. Langsam
- Three Pieces for Orchestra (Drei Orchesterstücke), Op. 6, composed 1914–15
1. Präludium
2. Reigen
3. Marsch
- Wozzeck, Op. 7, composed 1914–22
- Drei Bruchstücke aus ‘Wozzeck’, soprano and orchestra
- Kammerkonzert, piano, violin, and 13 winds, composed 1923–5
- Adagio, violin, clarinet and piano, arranged 1926 (arrangement of Kammerkonzert mvmt. 2)
- Schliesse mir die Augen beide (Theodor Storm), voice and piano, composed 1925
- Lyric Suite, string quartet, composed 1925–6
- Drei Sätze aus der Lyrischen Suite, arranged for string orchestra, 1928
- "Der Wein" (Charles Baudelaire), concert aria, soprano and orchestra, composed 1929
- Four-part Canon Alban Berg an das Frankfurter Opernhaus, composed 1930
- Lulu, composed 1929–35, orchestration of Act 3 completed by Friedrich Cerha
- Symphonische Stücke aus der Oper ‘Lulu’ (Lulu-Suite), soprano and orchestra, premièred under Kleiber in 1934
- Violin Concerto, composed 1935
- Vocal scores
  - Franz Schreker: Der ferne Klang (1911)
  - Arnold Schoenberg: Gurre-Lieder (1912)
  - Arnold Schoenberg: Litanei and Entrückung from String Quartet no.2, 1912
- Arrangement for string quartet, piano, and harmonium
  - Johann Strauss II: Wein, Weib und Gesang, 1921

== See also ==
- List of compositions by Anton Webern
