= Jessye Norman discography =

The following lists note recordings in opera and recital of soprano Jessye Norman.

== Discography ==
=== Opera ===
Norman sang many roles in audio recordings of complete operas:

- Bartók, Bluebeard's Castle (A Kékszakállú herceg vára, Sz. 48, op. 11) (Judith), cond. Pierre Boulez, with László Polgár (1993; Deutsche Grammophon, 1998)
- Beethoven, Fidelio (Leonore), cond. Bernard Haitink (Philips)
- Berlioz, Les Troyens (Cassandre/Didon), cond. James Levine (Met Opera on Demand, performance of 18 February 1984)
- Bizet, Carmen (Carmen), cond. Seiji Ozawa, with Neil Shicoff and Mirella Freni (Philips)
- Debussy, L'enfant prodigue (Lia), cond. Gary Bertini, with José Carreras and Dietrich Fischer-Dieskau (Orfeo)
- Fauré, Pénélope (Pénélope), cond. Charles Dutoit with Alain Vanzo and José van Dam (Erato)
- Gluck, Alceste (Alceste), cond. Serge Baudo, with Nicolai Gedda and Siegmund Nimsgern (Orfeo)
- Haydn, Armida (Armida), cond. Antal Doráti (Philips)
- Haydn, La vera Costanza (Rosina), cond. Antal Doráti (Philips)
- Mascagni, Cavalleria rusticana (Santuzza), cond. Semyon Bychkov, with Dmitri Hvorostovsky (Philips)
- Meyerbeer, L'Africaine (Sélica), cond. Riccardo Muti (live in Florence, 1971) (Opera d'oro)
- Mozart, Idomeneo (Idamante), cond. Colin Davis, with Heather Harper and Nicolai Gedda (live in Rome, 25 March 1971) (Opera d'oro)
- Mozart, Die Gärtnerin aus Liebe, German version of La finta giardiniera (Arminda), cond. Hans Schmidt-Isserstedt, with Helen Donath, Werner Hollweg, Ileana Cotrubas, Hermann Prey and Tatiana Troyanos (Philips)
- Mozart, Le nozze di Figaro (Countess), cond. Colin Davis, with Mirella Freni (Philips)
- Offenbach, La belle Hélène (Hélène), cond. Michel Plasson with Gabriel Bacquier and Jean-Philippe Lafont (EMI)
- Offenbach, Les contes d'Hoffmann (Giulietta), cond. Sylvain Cambreling, with Neil Shicoff and José van Dam (EMI)
- Offenbach, Les contes d'Hoffmann (Antonia), cond. Jeffrey Tate, with Anne-Sofie von Otter, Francisco Araiza, Samuel Ramey and Cheryl Studer (Philips)
- Purcell, Dido and Aeneas (Dido), cond. Raymond Leppard (Philips)
- Schoenberg, Erwartung, cond. James Levine (Philips)
- Strauss, Ariadne auf Naxos (Primadonna/Ariadne), cond. Kurt Masur, with Julia Varady, Dietrich Fischer-Dieskau, Edita Gruberova (Philips)
- Strauss, Salome (Salome), cond. Seiji Ozawa, with James Morris (Philips)
- Stravinski, Œdipus Rex (Jocaste), cond. Seiji Ozawa, with Peter Schreier, Bryn Terfel and Georges Wilson (narrator) (Philips)
- Stravinski, Œdipus Rex (Jocaste), cond. Colin Davis, with Thomas Moser, Siegmund Nimsgern and Michel Piccoli (narrator) (Orfeo)
- Verdi, Il corsaro (Medora), cond. Lamberto Gardelli, with Montserrat Caballé and José Carreras (Philips)
- Verdi, Un giorno di regno (Giulietta), cond. Lamberto Gardelli, with Fiorenza Cossotto and José Carreras (Philips)
- Verdi, Aida (Aida), cond. Nino Sanzogno, with Fiorenza Cossotto (live, Paris, 1973 – Opera d'oro)
- Wagner, Isoldes Liebestod, cond. Herbert von Karajan (live, Salzburg, 1987 – Deutsche Grammophon)
- Wagner, Opera Scenes (Tristan und Isolde – Prelude and Liebestod, Tannhäuser – Elisabeth, extr. acts 2 & 3, The Flying Dutchman – extr. act 2, Götterdämmerung – final scene), cond. Klaus Tennstedt (EMI)
- Wagner, Lohengrin (Elsa), cond. Georg Solti, with Plácido Domingo (Decca)
- Wagner, Die Walküre (Sieglinde), cond. James Levine, with Gary Lakes, James Morris, Hildegard Behrens and Christa Ludwig (Deutsche Grammophon)
- Wagner, Die Walküre (Sieglinde), cond. Marek Janowski, with Siegfried Jerusalem, Kurt Moll and Theo Adam (RCA)
- Wagner, Parsifal (Kundry), cond. James Levine, with Plácido Domingo (Deutsche Grammophon)
- Weber, Euryanthe (Euryanthe), cond. Marek Janowski, with Nicolai Gedda (Berlin Classics)

=== Lieder, songs ===
- Berg, Sieben frühe Lieder, Altenberg Lieder, London Symphony Orchestra, cond. Pierre Boulez — Jugendlieder, Zwei Lieder, Ann Schein (piano) (Sony)
- Berg, Der Wein, New York Philharmonic, cond. Pierre Boulez (Sony)
- Berlioz, Cléopâtre, Orchestre de Paris, cond. Daniel Barenboim (Deutsche Grammophon)
- Berlioz, Les Nuits d'été, London Symphony Orchestra, cond. Colin Davis (Philips)
- Berlioz, Roméo et Juliette, Philadelphia Orchestra, cond. Riccardo Muti (EMI)
- Brahms, Lieder, piano Daniel Barenboim (Deutsche Grammophon)
- Brahms, Lieder, piano Geoffrey Parsons (Philips)
- Brahms, Rhapsodie pour alto, Philadelphia Orchestra, cond. Riccardo Muti (Philips)
- Chausson, Poème de l'amour et de la mer, Chanson perpétuelle, Mélodies, Monte-Carlo Philharmonic Orchestra, cond. Armin Jordan, piano Michel Dalberto (Erato)
- Duparc, Mélodies, piano Dalton Baldwin (in Les Chemins de l'amour, Philips)
- Mahler, Lieder eines fahrenden Gesellen, Berliner Philharmoniker, cond. Bernard Haitink (Philips)
- Mahler, Kindertotenlieder, Boston Symphony Orchestra, cond. Seiji Ozawa (Philips)
- Mahler, Das Lied von der Erde, London Symphony Orchestra, cond. Colin Davis, with Jon Vickers (Philips)
- Mahler, Das Lied von der Erde, Berliner Philharmoniker, cond. James Levine, with Siegfried Jerusalem (Deutsche Grammophon)
- Mahler, Des Knaben Wunderhorn, Royal Concertgebouw Orchestra, cond. Bernard Haitink, with John Shirley-Quirk (Philips)
- Mahler, Lieder, piano Irwin Gage (in Schubert/Mahler, Philips)
- Poulenc, La Fraîcheur et le Feu, Tu vois le feu du soir, piano Irwin Gage (EMI)
- Poulenc, Voyage à Paris, Montparnasse, La Grenouillère, Les Chemins de l'amour, piano Dalton Baldwin (in Les Chemins de l'amour, Philips)
- Ravel, Shéhérazade, London Symphony Orchestra, cond. Colin Davis (Philips)
- Ravel, Chansons madécasses, membres de l'Ensemble intercontemporain, cond. Pierre Boulez (Sony)
- Ravel, Chansons madécasses, Chanson du rouet, piano Dalton Baldwin, cello Renaud Fontanarosa, flute Michel Debost (EMI)
- Ravel, Deux mélodies hébraïques, piano Dalton Baldwin (in Les Chemins de l'amour, Philips)
- Satie, La Statue de bronze, Daphénéo, Le Chapelier, Je te veux, piano Dalton Baldwin (in Les Chemins de l'amour, Philips)
- Schoenberg, Brettl-Lieder, piano James Levine (Philips)
- Schoenberg, Gurrelieder (Tove), Boston Symphony Orchestra, cond. Seiji Ozawa with Tatiana Troyanos and James McCracken (Philips)
- Schoenberg, Lied der Waldtaube, Ensemble intercontemporain, cond. Pierre Boulez (Sony)
- Schubert, Lieder, piano Phillip Moll (Philips)
- Schubert, Lieder, piano Irwin Gage (in Schubert/Mahler, Philips)
- Schumann, Frauenliebe und Leben, Liederkreis op. 39, piano Irwin Gage (Philips)
- Strauss, Vier letzte Lieder, and other Lieder with orchestra, Leipzig Gewandhaus Orchestra, cond. Kurt Masur (Philips)
- Strauss, Lieder, piano Geoffrey Parsons (Philips)
- Wagner, Wesendonck Lieder and Isoldes Liebestod, London Symphony Orchestra, cond. Colin Davis (Philips)
- Wagner, Wesendonck Lieder, BBC Symphony Orchestra, cond. Pierre Boulez (live, Londres, BBC Proms, 1974 – Gala)
- Wagner, two Wesendonck Lieder : "Schmerzen" et "Träume", BBC Symphony Orchestra, cond. Colin Davis (live, London, Royal Albert Hall, 1972, included in the CD The Last Night of the Proms, Philips)
- Wagner, Wesendonck Lieder, piano Irwin Gage (EMI)
- Schubert/Mahler: Lieder, piano Irwin Gage (Philips)
- Les Chemins de l'amour (Duparc, Ravel, Poulenc, Satie), piano Dalton Baldwin (Philips)
- Tchaikovsky Gala in Leningrad, cond. Yuri Temirkanov, with Itzhak Perlman and Yo-Yo Ma : Chansons françaises op. 65, n° 1 "Sérénade" & 6 "Rondel"; "Adieu, forêts", extr. de La Pucelle d'Orléans (live, Leningrad, 1990 – RCA)
- Jessye Norman: Edinburgh International Festival 1972 (Brahms, Ravel, Schubert, Strauss) (Arkadia)
- An Evening with Jessye Norman (Purcell, Wagner-Wesendonck Lieder, Mahler-Rückert Lieder, Ravel-Mélodies hébraïques, Spitituals, Wolf, Debussy), piano Irwin Gage (non mentionné sur le cd) (live, années 70 – Opera d'oro)
- Live at Hohenems (1987) (Handel, Schumann, Schubert, Brahms, Strauss, Spirituals), piano Geoffrey Parsons (Philips)
- Jessye Norman Live – Geoffrey Parsons (1987) (Haydn, Handel, Berg, Mahler, Strauss, Spirituals, Ravel) (Philips)
- Salzburg Recital (1990) (Beethoven, Hugo Wolf, Debussy), piano James Levine (Philips)
- La Marseillaise, dir. Semyon Bychkov (Philips, 1989, bicentenaire de la Révolution française)

=== Symphonies, masses, oratorios ===
- Beethoven, Missa Solemnis, Wiener Philharmoniker, cond. James Levine with Cheryl Studer, Plácido Domingo and Kurt Moll (Deutsche Grammophon)
- Beethoven, Symphony No. 9, Wiener Philharmoniker, cond. Karl Böhm, with Brigitte Fassbaender, Plácido Domingo and Walter Berry (Deutsche Grammophon)
- Beethoven, Symphony No. 9, Chicago Symphony Orchestra, cond. Georg Solti, with Reinhild Runkel, Robert Schunk and Hans Sotin (Decca)
- Brahms, A German Requiem (Ein deutsches Requiem), London Philharmonic Orchestra, cond. Klaus Tennstedt, with Jorma Hynninen (EMI)
- Bruckner, Te Deum, Chicago Symphony Orchestra, cond. Daniel Barenboim, with Samuel Ramey, David Rendall and Yvonne Minton (Deutsche Grammophon)
- Franck, Les Béatitudes (oratorio), Bavarian Radio Symphony Orchestra, cond. Rafael Kubelík, with Brigitte Fassbaender, René Kollo, Dietrich Fischer-Dieskau (Gala)
- Mahler, Symphony No. 2, Orchestre philharmonique de Vienne, cond. Lorin Maazel, with Éva Marton (Sony)
- Mahler, Symphony No. 2, Musicians against Nuclear Arms Orchestra, cond. Leonard Bernstein, with Barbara Hendricks (live, Washington, 1984, Rare Moth)
- Mahler, Symphony No. 3, Wiener Philharmoniker, cond. Claudio Abbado (Deustche Grammophon)
- Mahler, Symphony No. 3, Boston Symphony Orchestra, cond. Seiji Ozawa (Philips)
- Tippett, A Child of Our Time (oratorio), BBC Symphony Orchestra, cond. Colin Davis, with Janet Baker and John Shirley-Quirk (Philips)
- Verdi, Messa da Requiem, Bavarian Radio Symphony Orchestra & Chorus, cond. Riccardo Muti, with Agnes Baltsa, José Carreras, Yevgeny Nesterenko (live, Munich, 1981, BR Klassik)

=== Others ===
- Spirituals, piano Dalton Baldwin (Philips)
- Spirituals in concert, cond. James Levine, with Kathleen Battle (live, New York – Deutsche Grammophon)
- With a song in my heart (Richard Rodgers, Cole Porter, Jerome Kern ...) (Philips)
- Lucky to be me (Leonard Bernstein, George Gershwin, Kurt Weill, Michel Legrand, Billy Joel, Richard Rodgers) (Philips)
- I was born in love with you : Jessye Norman sings Michel Legrand (Philips)
- Jessye Norman at Notre-Dame, cond. Lawrence Foster (Philips)
- In the Spirit: Sacred Music for Christmas (Philips)
- Christmastide (Philips)
- Les plus beaux Ave Maria et chants sacrés, cond. Kurt Redel (Philips)
- Sacred Songs, cond. Alexander Gibson (Philips)
- Amazing Grace (Philips)
- Roots: my Life, my Song (Sony)

=== Video ===
- Berlioz, Les Troyens (Cassandre), cond. James Levine, with Plácido Domingo and Tatiana Troyanos (DVD Deutsche Grammophon-Universal; Met Opera on Demand)
- Poulenc, Dialogues des Carmélites, (Madame Lidoine), cond. Manuel Rosenthal, with Maria Ewing, Betsy Norden, and Régine Crespin (Met Opera on Demand)
- Strauss, Ariadne auf Naxos (Primadonna/Ariadne), cond. James Levine, with James King, Kathleen Battle and Tatiana Troyanos (DVD Deutsche Grammophon-Universal; Met Opera on Demand)
- Stravinsky, Œdipus Rex (Jocaste), cond. Seiji Ozawa, with Philip Langridge and Bryn Terfel (DVD Philips-Universal)
- Vangelis, Mythodea: Music for the NASA Mission: 2001 Mars Odyssey, with Kathleen Battle (DVD Sony)
- Verdi, Requiem, cond. Claudio Abbado, with Margaret Price, José Carreras and Ruggero Raimondi (DVD Arthaus Musik)
- Wagner, Die Walküre (Sieglinde), cond. James Levine, with Gary Lakes, James Morris, Hildegard Behrens and Christa Ludwig (DVD Deutsche Grammophon-Universal; Met Opera on Demand)
- Wagner, Isoldes Liebestod, dir. Herbert von Karajan (+ an extract of the rehearsal), in Karajan in Salzburg (VHS Deutsche Grammophon)
- Jessye Norman sings Carmen, cond. Seiji Ozawa (DVD Philips)
- Hohenems Recital (Handel, Schumann, Schubert, Brahms, Strauss, Spirituals), piano Geoffrey Parsons (VHS Philips)
- Spirituals in concert, cond. James Levine, with Kathleen Battle (VHS Deutsche Grammophon)
- The Seattle Symphony Orchestra Live From Benaroya Hall, cond. Gerard Schwarz (VHS Lark)
- Jessye Norman at Christmas (concert à Notre-Dame de Paris), cond. Lawrence Foster (DVD Philips-Universal)
- Christmastide (VHS Philips)
- Amazing Grace with Bill Moyers (VHS)
- Symphony for the Spire, with Plácido Domingo, Kenneth Brannagh, Ofra Harnoy and Charlton Heston (DVD Warner)
- The People's Passion: A Musical for Easter, with Thomas Allen (DVD Warner)
- Marian Anderson (VHS Kultur Video)
- Jessye Norman: A Portrait (DVD Decca-Universal)
