= Fritz Heinrich Klein =

Austrian composer (1892–1977)

Fritz Heinrich Klein (2 February 1892 – 12 July 1977) was an Austrian composer.

== Life and music ==
Klein was born in Budapest. He was a student of Alban Berg and the inventor of the all-interval twelve-tone row. He studied with Schoenberg from 1917 to 1918, with Berg from 1918 to 1924, and prepared the piano-vocal score for Berg's Wozzeck and the piano score of Berg's Chamber Concerto.

Klein's twelve-tone theories, which he refers to as "extonal", appear to originate independently of Schoenberg's as with Josef Matthias Hauer's, and these claims as well as frequent stylistic changes helped to exclude him from the Second Viennese School, though Klein's theories where highly influential on Alban Berg. Klein considered his piece for two pianos, Die Maschine: Eine extonale Selbstsatire [The Machine: An Extonal Satire], Op. 1 (1921) the first in which a twelve-tone row appears along with its retrograde, inversion, and transposed forms. This piece was printed in 1923 before Schoenberg's Op. 25 or writings on the twelve-tone technique.

An all-interval row is a tone row arranged so that it contains one instance of each interval within the octave, 0 through 11. For example, the first all-interval row, by Klein: F, E, C, A, G, D, A♭, D♭, E♭, G♭, B♭, C♭.

Movement I tone row.

In integers this row is represented as

0 e 7 4 2 9 3 8 t 1 5 6

with the interval between each note being

 e 8 9 t 7 6 5 2 3 4 1

Pyramid chord

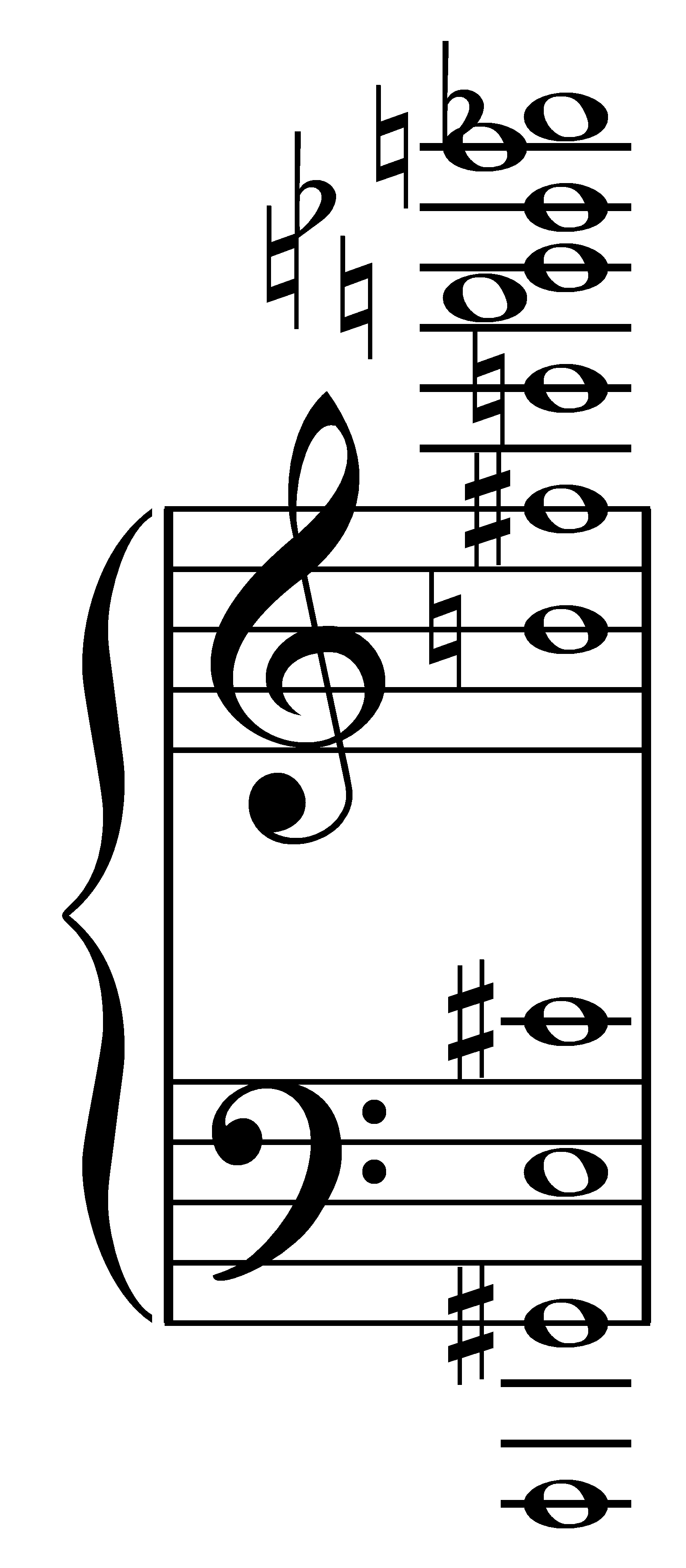
Mother chord

This row was also used by Berg in his Lyric Suite and in his second setting of the Theodor Storm's poem Schliesse mir die Augen beide. Klein used the mother chord in his Die Maschine, Op. 1, and derived it from the pyramid chord:

0 0 e 9 6 2 9 3 8 0 3 5 6

difference

   e t 9 8 7 6 5 4 3 2 1

by transposing the underlined notes (0369) down two semitones. The pyramid chord consists of every interval stacked, low to high, from 12 to 1 and while it contains all intervals, it does not contain all pitch classes and is thus not a tone row but shares properties with the all-interval tone row. For example, since the sum of numbers 1 through 11 equals 66, an all-interval row must contain a tritone between its first and last notes (as does the Pyramid chord).

Klein died in Linz, aged 85. He described his approach to the twelve-tone technique in "Die Grenze der Halbtonwelt" ["The Boundary of the Semitone World"], Die Musik vol. 17 (1925) no. 4, pp. 281–286. His Die Maschine and ten Extonal Pieces, Op. 4, appear on Steffen Schleiermacher's album The Viennese School - Teachers and Followers: Alban Berg (MDG 613 1475-2), along with music by Theodor W. Adorno and Hans Erich Apostel.
