= Günter Mayer =

German cultural academic and musicologist

Günter Mayer (6 November 1930 – 2 September 2010) was a German cultural academic and musicologist.

== Activities ==
Born in Berlin, Mayer dealt with aesthetics, music aesthetics and music sociology, general theory of culture and art, media theory and media aesthetics. From 1980 to 1994 he was professor at the Humboldt University in Berlin. He was the editor of the collected works of Hanns Eisler, published in three volumes, and the planned historical-critical complete edition of Eisler's works. Mayer was a member of the scientific advisory boards of the Historisch-kritisches Wörterbuch des Marxismus and the journal The Argument and since 2007 deputy chairman of the Berliner Institut für kritische Theorie.

== Achievements ==
Hanns-Werner Heister, with whom Mayer has worked for a long time, highlights as conceptual innovations the "dialectics of material" of the artistic avant-garde; the "contradiction between utility value and design value" in aesthetic evaluation; language as a non-technical concept of the mass medium; mass culture as a dialectical relationship between culture, subject and masses; technical production and reproduction through electrification and digitalization as the real revolution of music in the 20th century.

Besides Georg Knepler, Mayer was in 1978 in his book Weltbild, Notenbild one of the first, who in the GDR admonished a differentiated reception of the theories of Theodor W. Adorno, who had long been perceived as alleged anti-Marxist and therefore rejected.

== Publications ==
- Die Kategorie des musikalischen Materials in den ästhetischen Anschauungen Hanns Eislers. Zur Entwicklung der Theorie und Geschichte des sozialistischen Realismus im Bereich der marxistischen Musikästhetik. Berlin 1970
- Über die Spezifik des ästhetischen Verhältnisses. Ein Beitrag zu weltanschaulich-methodologischen Grundfragen der marxistisch-leninistischen Ästhetik, 2 volumes. Dissertation B, Humboldt-Universität, 1977
- Weltbild, Notenbild. Zur Dialektik des musikalischen Materials. Reclam, Leipzig 1978 (Reclams Universal-Bibliothek, volume 767) und Röderberg-Verlag, Frankfurt 1978, ISBN 3-87682-452-4 (Röderberg-Taschenbuch, volume 75)
- Zur Theorie des Ästhetischen. Musik – Medien – Kultur – Politik, ausgewählte Schriften herausgegeben von Hanns-Werner Heister. Weidler, Berlin 2006, ISBN 3-89693-458-9 (Zwischen/Töne, Neue Folge, volume 5) Publisher announcement

== Editions ==
- Hanns Eisler, Gesammelte Werke. Deutscher Verlag für Musik, Leipzig
  - Volume 1: Musik und Politik, Schriften 1924–1948. 1st edition 1973, 2nd edition 1985
  - VOlume 2: Musik und Politik, Schriften 1948–1962. 1982
  - Volume 3: Schriften, Addenda. 1983
- on behalf of the deutschen Musikrates: Tradition in den Musikkulturen – heute und morgen. Bericht über die wissenschaftliche Konferenz des Internationalen Musikrates, 2–4 October 1985 in Berlin. Deutscher Verlag für Musik, Leipzig 1987, ISBN 3-370-00083-0 (German, English, French)
- on behalf of the Internationalen Hanns-Eisler-Gesellschaft e. V.: Hanns Eisler der Zeitgenosse: Positionen – Perspektiven. Materialien zu den Eisler-Festen 1994/95. Deutscher Verlag für Musik, Leipzig 1997, ISBN 3-370-00359-7
- with Wolfgang Martin Stroh: Musikwissenschaftlicher Paradigmenwechsel? Zum Stellenwert marxistischer Ansätze in der Musikforschung. BIS-Verlag, Oldenburg 2000, ISBN 3-8142-0726-2, also bis.uni-oldenburg.de

== Literature ==
- Hanns-Werner Heister, Günter Mayer, Wolfgang Martin Stroh (ed.): Musik-Avantgarde: zur Dialektik von Vorhut und Nachhut. Eine Gedankensammlung für Günter Mayer zum 75. Geburtstag. BIS-Verlag, Oldenburg 2006, ISBN 978-3-8142-2001-7 (German, English, Italian)
