= Three Pieces for Orchestra (Berg) =

Drei Orchesterstücke Three Pieces for Orchestra
- by Alban Berg
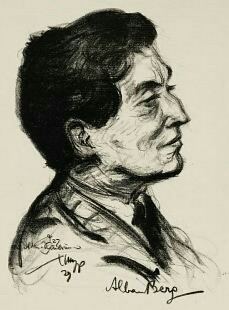
- The composer, sketched by Emil Stumpp in 1927
- Opus: 6
- Composed: 1913–15
- Dedication: Arnold Schoenberg
- Published: 1929 (revised)

Alban Berg composed his Three Pieces for Orchestra (German: Drei Orchesterstücke), Op. 6, during 1913 and 1914. They are dedicated to his teacher Arnold Schoenberg. A revised version of the score was published in 1929 by Universal Edition. The first performance of the first two pieces took place in Berlin in 1923, conducted by Anton Webern; the complete work was premiered (in the revised version) in Oldenburg in 1930, conducted by Johannes Schüler.

== History ==
Berg composed the Three Pieces between 1913 and 1915. Studying with Arnold Schoenberg, he had composed mainly lieder such as Altenberg Lieder, and thought about a larger composition, such as a suite or a symphony. He settled with orchestral pieces, and worked on them in Trahütten, Styria, in summer, where his parents-in-law had a country estate. The work was completed on 23 August 1914.

Berg dedicated it "to my teacher and friend Arnold Schoenberg with immeasurable gratitude and love", and sent it to Schönberg as a gift for his 40th birthday, on 13 September 1914. In a letter he expanded: "I have truly striven to give my best, to follow all your incentives and suggestions, whereby the unforgettable, yea revolutionising experiences of the Amsterdam rehearsals and thorough study of your orchestra pieces served me boundlessly and sharpened my self-criticism more and more."

The premiere of the first two pieces was held in Berlin on 5 June 1923 during an Austrian Music Week, conducted by Anton Webern. It was not until 14 April 1930 that the complete composition was played, in its revised form, by the Oldenburger Landesorchester conducted by Johannes Schüler.

== Structure ==
The three pieces are:

1. Präludium (Prelude)

An instrumentally colourful, impressionistic prelude. After a murmuring introduction, an evocative, wide-ranging theme is stated by bassoons and violins, and then fully developed.

2. Reigen (Round Dance)

Replete with both waltz music and Ländler music, this piece demonstrates an inherent eclecticism that, as in many of Berg's works, permitted a synthesis of old and new, classical and popular, often infused with grotesquerie.

3. Marsch (March)

A sizable and highly imaginative march, notable for its element of chaos and its extremes of orchestration.

The score is marked for the possibility of playing the two first movements alone, as at the premiere. When the complete work was premiered, Berg compared the sequence of three movements to a symphony, Reigen taking the position of a Scherzo, and Marsch as a finale. Derrick Puffett suggested that the title may allude to Arthur Schnitzler's play Reigen, of which Berg owned a copy.

Adorno wrote about the finale in his 1968 analysis of Berg works, connecting it to Schoenberg's Five Pieces for Orchestra and Mahler's Ninth Symphony:

Berg let himself go with complete abandon in the March from the Three Pieces for Orchestra, an absolutely stupendous work….When he showed me the score and explained it I remarked of the first visual impression: "That must sound like playing Schoenberg's [Five] Orchestral Pieces and Mahler's Ninth Symphony, all at the same time." I will never forget the look of pleasure this compliment—dubious for any other cultured ear—induced. With a ferocity burying all Johannine gentleness like an avalanche, he answered: "Right, then at last one could hear what an eight-note brass chord really sounds like," as if convinced no audience could survive such a sonority….

== Instrumentation ==
The work is scored for:

Woodwinds

4 flutes (all doubling piccolo)
4 oboes (4th doubling cor anglais)
4 clarinets in A (3rd doubling clarinet in E♭)
1 bass clarinet in B♭
3 bassoons
1 contrabassoon

Brass

6 horns in F
4 trumpets in F
4 trombones (3 tenor, 1 bass)
contrabass tuba

Percussion

2 sets of timpani
bass drum
snare drum
clash cymbals (including a cymbal attached to the bass drum)
suspended cymbal
large tam-tam
small tam-tam
tenor drum (or field drum) in 2nd & 3rd movement only
triangle in 2nd & 3rd movement only
hammer (not metallic, quasi "Mahler") in 3rd movement only
glockenspiel (3.3 octave range ideal – C_{5} to D_{8} required)
xylophone (4 octave range ideal – C_{4} to E_{7} required)

celesta (5 octave range)

Strings

2 harps

violins I
violins II
violas
violoncellos
double basses

== Sources ==
- Lee, Douglas. "Masterworks of 20th Century Music", Routledge, 2002. ISBN 0-415-93847-3, ISBN 978-0-415-93847-1
- Steinberg, Michael. Program Notes for Berg, 3 Pieces for Orchestra. accessed 2009-01-15
- Mark DeVoto. Program Notes for Berg, Three Pieces for Orchestra. accessed February 12, 2010
- Huscher, Philip. Program Notes for Alban Berg, Three Pieces for Orchestra, Op. 6. accessed 7 August 2014.
