= Ruzena Herlinger =

Czech-Canadian singer

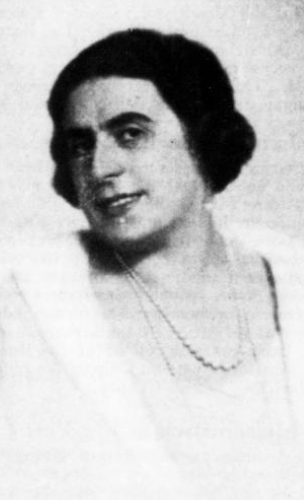
- Ruzena Herlinger in 1927
- Born: Růžena Schwarzová; 8 February 1893; Tábor, Bohemia, Austria-Hungary
- Died: February 19, 1978 (aged 88); Montreal, Canada
- Other names: Růžena Herlingerová, Rose Schwartz
- Occupations: Singer, voice teacher
- Years active: 1915–1945
- Spouse: JUDr. Alfred Herlinger (1883–1936)

Ruzena Schwartz Herlinger (Czech: Růžena Schwarzová Herlingerová) (8 February 1893 – 19 February 1978) was a Czech-born Canadian singer and voice teacher, noted for performing and promoting the works of contemporary European composers in the 1920s and 1930s.

== Early life and education ==
Schwartz was born on 8 February 1890 in Tábor, Bohemia. She studied piano and voice from childhood, and trained in Vienna and Berlin, where she moved in 1910.

== Career ==
Herlinger, described as a soprano and a mezzo-soprano, performed and promoted works by modern European composers, including Maurice Ravel, Erik Satie, Paul Pisk, Anton Webern, Ernst Krenek, Gustav Mahler, and Alban Berg; Berg wrote a concert aria, "Der Wein", for her. She was active in the International Society for Contemporary Music in Vienna. "She has a voice of superior beauty and highly cultivated," wrote one critic in 1934, "while her phrasing and expression bespeak high musicality and taste". In 1935, she returned to Prague with her husband, lawyer, politician and publicist Dr. Alfred Herlinger, and their little daughter. She started to work as a choirmaster at Czechoslovak Radio Praha and taught singing. The husband died on January 29, 1936.

Because of her Jewish origin, Herlinger had to flee Czechoslovakia in 1938. During World War II Herlinger lived in England and she was singing for British soldiers. After the war, she returned to Prague for a few years, to conduct the Prague Radio Choir again.

She moved to Canada in 1949. She taught voice at the Conservatoire de musique du Québec (CMM) from 1957 to 1962, and at McGill University from 1963 to 1970. Her notable Canadian students included Claire Gagnier, Joseph Rouleau, Huguette Tourangeau, and André Turp.

== Personal life ==
Schwartz married a Czech lawyer and politician Dr. Alfred Herlinger. She became a Canadian citizen at the age of 71, in 1954. She died on 6 September 1978, at the age of 85, in Montreal. There is a collection of her papers in the Oskar Morawetz Collection of the Music Division of the Library and Archives Canada, in Ottawa.
