= Der Wein =

1929 concert aria by Alban Berg

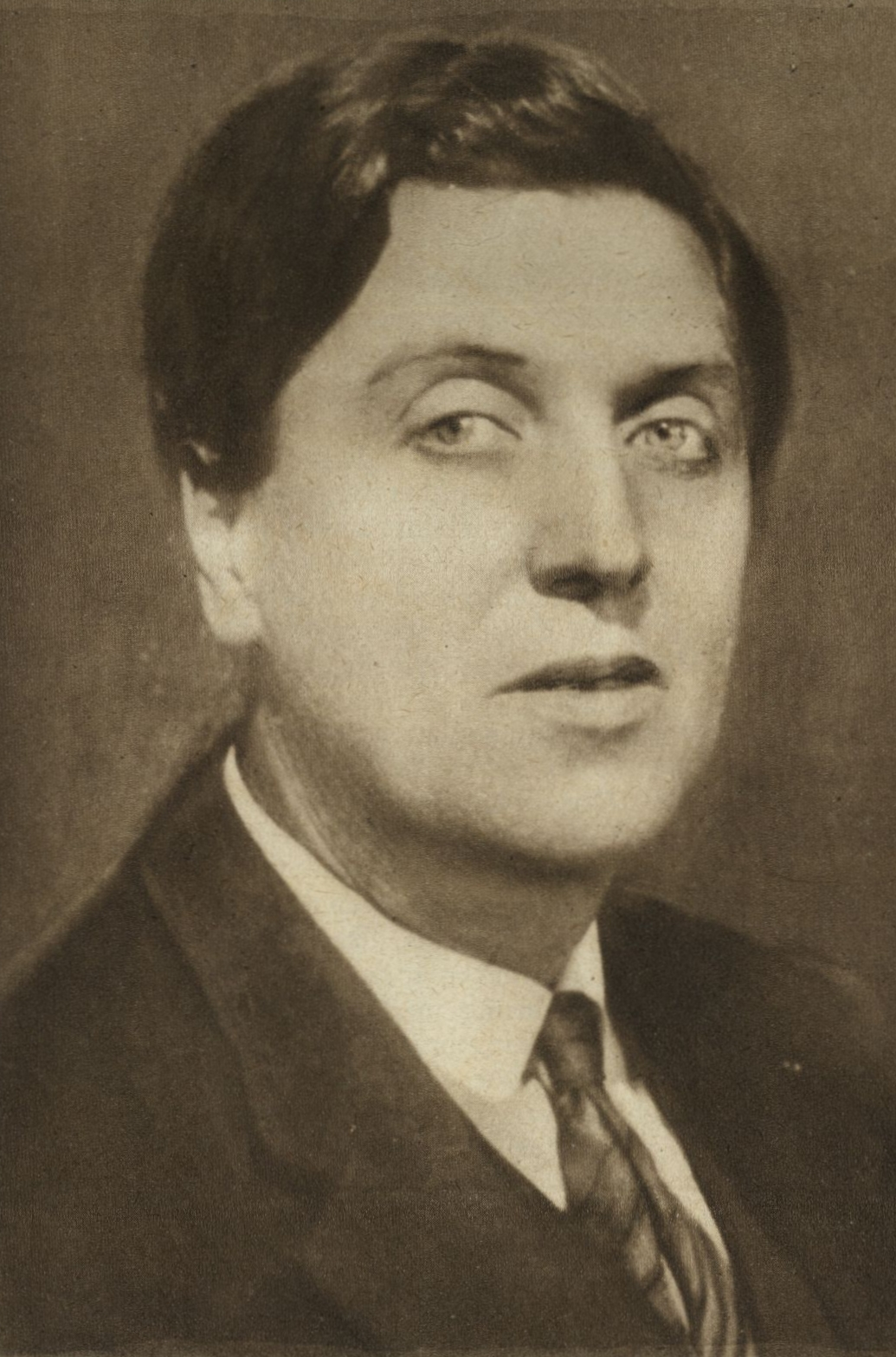
Alban Berg c. 1930

"Der Wein" (The Wine) is a concert aria for soprano and orchestra, composed in 1929 by Alban Berg. The lyrics are from Stefan George's translation of three poems from Charles Baudelaire's Les Fleurs du mal, as is the secret text of Berg's Lyric Suite: "Die Seele des Weines" (The Wine's Soul), "Der Wein der Liebenden" (The Wine of Lovers), and "Der Wein des Einsamen" (The Wine of the Lonely One). The aria was commissioned by and dedicated to Ruzena Herlinger. She and Hermann Scherchen premiered it in Königsberg on 4 June 1930.

Prime form of the tone row from "Der Wein"

The piece includes a parody of a tango (bars 39, 181) and includes an alto saxophone. The tone row contains a complete ascending D harmonic minor scale and the remaining five notes are ordered so that in the inverted form they arpeggiate a jazzy added sixth chord with blue third (G, F, D♭, D, B♭). The central sonority of the work, as characteristic of Berg's later music, comprises triads separated by half an octave: F and B♮ (in German: H) superimposed over a low D♭. These two letter names, H and F, are presumably a reference to Hanna Fuchs-Robettin, and the title may be a reference to her husband's wine cellar.

The music of the central section of a ternary A–B–A structure "is a palindrome within itself," with the outer sections being through-composed. Bars 112 to 140 are then heard in retrograde as bars 140 to 170.
