= Anna Nahowski =

Austrian royal mistress (1860–1941)

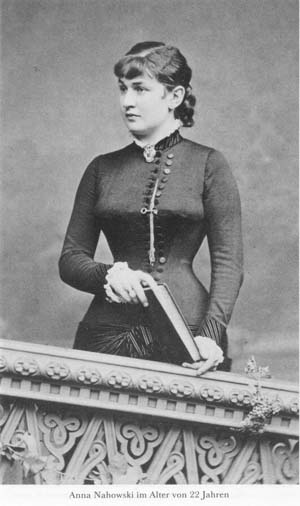
- Anna Nahowski
- Born: 1860
- Died: 1931 (aged 70–71)
- Occupation: Royal mistress

Anna Nahowski (1860–1931) was the mistress of Franz Joseph of Austria from 1875 until 1889.

She was from the age of fourteen married to the silk manufacturer Heuduck, who was heavily indebted by gambling and alcoholism. She met Franz Joseph at a walk in the park of Schönbrunn. The relationship was arranged between Anna and Franz Joseph without the knowledge of her spouse. Franz Joseph visited her discreetly and regularly while her husband (whose debts were paid) was away. This arrangement continued also after she remarried the decadent Franz Nahowski. In 1889, Nahowski discovered that Franz Joseph was in parallel involved, and this time more publicly, with Katharina Schratt, which made Franz Joseph end the relationship to Nahowski. Anna Nahowski was given economic compensation for both herself and her children (whose paternity is uncertain) in exchange for signing a contract of silence. Her daughter Helene Berg, who is believed to have been the emperor's, was the wife of the composer Alban Berg. Other children named Franz Joseph and Anna Lebert are also attributed to him.

Her diary was published in 1976.

== Sources ==
Friedrich Saathen (Hrsg.): Anna Nahowski und Kaiser Franz Josef. Aufzeichnungen. Böhlau, Wien 1986, ISBN 3-205-05037-1.
