= Seven Early Songs (Berg) =

Song cycle composed by Alban Berg

Sieben frühe Lieder Seven Early Songs
- Lieder by Alban Berg
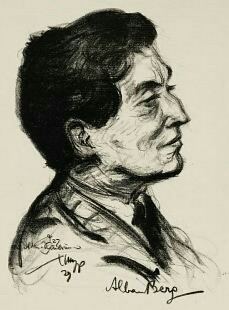
- The composer, sketched by Emil Stumpp in 1927
- Text: poems by Carl Hauptmann, Nikolaus Lenau, Theodor Storm, Rainer Maria Rilke, Johannes Schlaf, Otto Erich Hartleben, Paul Hohenberg
- Language: German
- Composed: 1905–08
- Scoring: medium voice; piano

The Seven Early Songs (Sieben frühe Lieder) (c. 1905 – 1908), are early compositions of Alban Berg, written while he was under the tutelage of Arnold Schoenberg. They are an interesting synthesis combining Berg's heritage of pre-Schoenberg song writing with the rigour and undeniable influence of Schoenberg. The writing very much carries with it the heritage of Richard Strauss (although the influences of a number of other composers can be discerned – Robert Schumann, Gustav Mahler, and Hugo Wolf for example, as well as Claude Debussy's harmonic palette in evidence in "Nacht"), through the expansiveness of gesture and 'opening of new vistas,' and that of Richard Wagner. The songs were first written for a medium voice and piano; the composer himself revised them in 1928 for high voice and orchestra.

== Structure ==
The seven songs are:

1. Nacht (Night) – text by Carl Hauptmann
2. Schilflied (Song amid the reeds) – Nikolaus Lenau
3. Die Nachtigall (The nightingale) – Theodor Storm
4. Traumgekrönt (Crowned in dream) – Rainer Maria Rilke
5. Im Zimmer (Indoors) – Johannes Schlaf
6. Liebesode (Ode to Love) – Otto Erich Hartleben
7. Sommertage (Summer days) – Paul Hohenberg

== Instrumentation ==
The orchestral version is scored for high voice (soprano) and:

- 2 flutes (2nd doubling piccolo), 2 oboes (2nd doubling English horn), 2 clarinets in B flat, bass clarinet in A, 2 bassoons, contrabassoon;
- 4 horns in F, trumpet in F, 2 tenor trombones;
- timpani, percussion (bass drum, side drum, cymbals, triangle, tam-tam), harp, celesta;
- strings: violins I and II, violas, violoncellos, double basses.

== U.S. Premiere ==
Its first American performance was by Suzanne Sten with the Erie (PA) Philharmonic Orchestra, Fritz Mahler conducting, on 26 October 1949.
