= Skandalkonzert =

1913 concert in Vienna, Austria

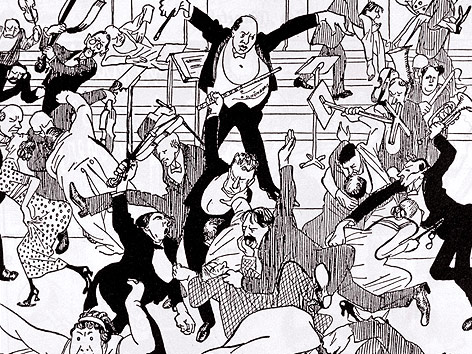
A caricature of the concert which appeared in Die Zeit on 6 April, 1913.

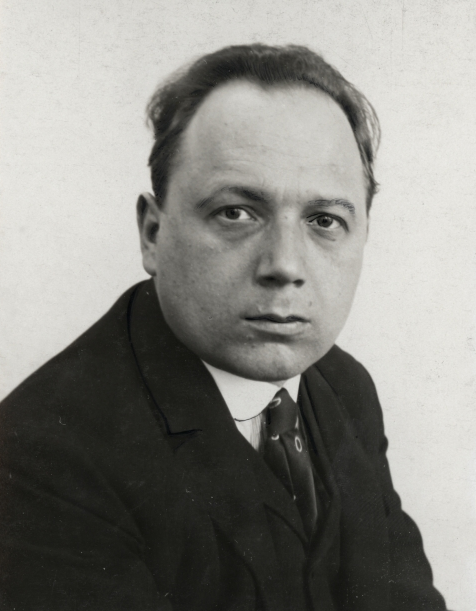
Buschbeck, an organizer of the Skandalkonzert who allegedly slapped a concertgoer

The Skandalkonzert ("scandal concert") was a concert conducted by Arnold Schoenberg, held on 31 March 1913. The concert was held by the Vienna Concert Society in the Great Hall of the Musikverein in Vienna. The concert consisted of music by composers of the Second Viennese School.

During the concert, the audience, shocked by the expressionism and experimentalism of the music, began rioting, and the concert ended prematurely. Amid the unrest, concert organizer Erhard Buschbeck was said to have slapped a concertgoer in the face; this would eventually lead to a lawsuit against Buschbeck. The event also led to an alternate name for the Skandalkonzert: Watschenkonzert, from the Austrian German for "slap concert". Operetta composer Oscar Straus, a witness to the alleged assault, testified that the slap had been "the most harmonious sound of the evening."

== Programme ==
The programme listed:

- Anton Webern: Six Pieces for Orchestra, Op. 6.
- Alexander von Zemlinsky: Four Orchestral Songs on poems by Maeterlinck (eventually published as Zemlinsky's Op. 13, Nos. 1, 2, 3 and 5 were performed at the Skandalkonzert).
- Arnold Schoenberg: Chamber Symphony No. 1, Op. 9.
- Alban Berg: Two of the Five Orchestral Songs on Picture-Postcard Texts by Peter Altenberg, Op. 4 Nos. 2 and 3. Both the lyrical and musical side of this premiere were seen as provocative.
- Gustav Mahler: Kindertotenlieder. The concert was ended before the scheduled performance of the piece could begin.

During Berg's songs the audience called for both the poet and composer to be committed, despite it being public knowledge that Altenberg was already committed to an asylum at the time. Though not present at the concert, he was granted leave to attend the dress-rehearsal that morning, and three days later he wrote a prose sketch depicting Alma Mahler there. At the concert it was during Berg's songs that the fighting began. At the trial, Straus commented that the thud of Buschbeck's punch had been the most harmonious sound at the entire concert. For Berg's work the Skandalkonzert had lasting consequences: the songs were not performed again until 1952, and the full score did not appear in print until 1966.

== History and contemporary echo ==
The first performance of Schoenberg's Gurrelieder was held on 23 February 1913, in the Great Hall of the Musikverein, under the direction of Franz Schreker, and was an overwhelming success. But the composer, offended by the previous conservative attitude of the Viennese public, refused to accept the applause. In return, the audience took revenge a few weeks later in the next concert of contemporary works there. Press reports from the period mention tumultuous riots: Schoenberg's followers and a student of his and opponents yelling at each other, throwing things, disturbing the performance, destroying furniture, etc.

The famous fracas at the premiere of Igor Stravinsky's The Rite of Spring took place in Paris two months later, on 29 May 1913.
