= Lyric Suite (Berg) =

String quartet music by Alban Berg

- String quartet by Alban Berg
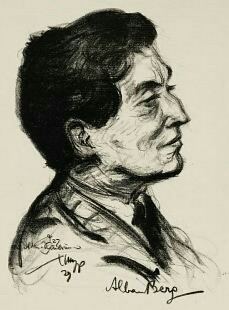
- Sketch of Alban Berg by Emil Stumpp (1927)
- Composed: 1925–26
- Dedication: Alexander von Zemlinsky
- Movements: Six

Alban Berg's Lyric Suite (1925–1926) is a six-movement string quartet using twelve-tone technique. Publicly dedicated to Alexander Zemlinsky (and quoting his Lyric Symphony), Berg secretly dedicated it to Hanna Fuchs-Robettin as program music about their romance and its dissolution. He arranged three of the movements as pieces for string orchestra in 1928.

== Composition and analysis ==
The string quartet has six movements:

1. Allegretto gioviale
2. Andante amoroso
3. Allegro misterioso – Trio estatico
4. Adagio appassionato
5. Presto delirando – Tenebroso
6. Largo desolato

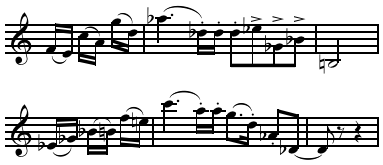
Initial thematic statement of the tone row, mm. 2–4, cyclically permuted to begin on E♭ in mm. 7–9

As Berg's friend and fellow Schoenberg pupil Erwin Stein wrote in the preface to the score, "[t]he work (Ist and VIth part, the main part of the IIIrd and the middle section of the Vth) has been mostly written strictly in accordance with Schoenberg's technique of the 'Composition with 12 inwardly related tones'. A set of 12 different tones gives the rough material of the composition, and the portions which have been treated more freely still adhere more or less to the technique". George Perle points out that the first movement is not strictly twelve-tone, with the opening four chords being derived not from the series but from the interval-7 cycle.

The first analysis was undertaken by H. F. Redlich, who notices that "the first movement of the Lyric Suite develops out of the disorder of intervals in its first bar, the notes of which, strung out horizontally, present the complete chromatic scale, and from this in the second and following bars, grows the Basic Set in its thematic shape".

Theodor W. Adorno called the quartet "a latent opera". Redlich described "the concealed vocality of the Lyric Suite" despite having no knowledge of the setting of Baudelaire's De profundis clamavi in the finale movement, deciphered by Douglass M. Green from what Perle calls "Berg's cryptic notations".

Perle discovered a complete copy of the first edition annotated by Berg for his dedicatee, Hanna Fuchs-Robettin (Franz Werfel's sister, with whom Berg had an affair in the 1920s), later that year. Berg used the signature motif, A-B-H-F (in German notation, B means B♭, while H means B♮), to combine Alban Berg (A. B.) and Hanna Fuchs-Robettin (H. F.). This is most prominent in the third movement. Berg also quotes a melody from Zemlinsky's Lyric Symphony in movement four which originally set the words "You are mine own". In the last movement, according to Berg's self-analysis, the "entire material, the tonal element too... as well as the Tristan motif" is developed "by strict adherence to the 12-note series".

=== I. Allegretto giovale ===
According to René Leibowitz, the first movement is "entirely written in the twelve-tone technique, [it] is a sonata movement without the development. Thus the recapitulation follows directly upon the exposition; but, because of the highly advanced twelve-tone technique of variation, everything in this movement is developmental".

The tone row of the first movement is

Pople adds a bar line to group the first and the last six pitches. He also depicts it as:

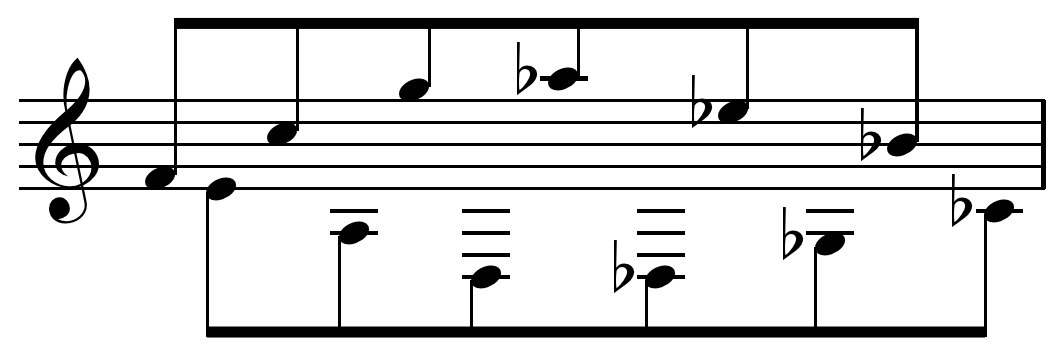

Whenever a given row-form is immediately repeated, a reversed coupling of the hexachords is employed to produce a secondary set. Berg had used the row previously, in 1925, in his first twelve-tone work, his second setting of "Schliesse mir die Augen beide".

=== III. Allegro misterioso – Trio estatico ===
In the third movement, the outer sections of the Allegro misterioso present the same music forwards and then backwards, while the Trio estatico, the B section of the ABA, is through-composed. Berg generates a characteristic rhythmic cell through partitioning the series into a seven-note chromatic segment and a complementary five-note motive from the remaining notes.

According to Wolfgang Martin Stroh, the tone row of the third movement is

which can be partitioned into a rising chromatic segment and remaining pitches:

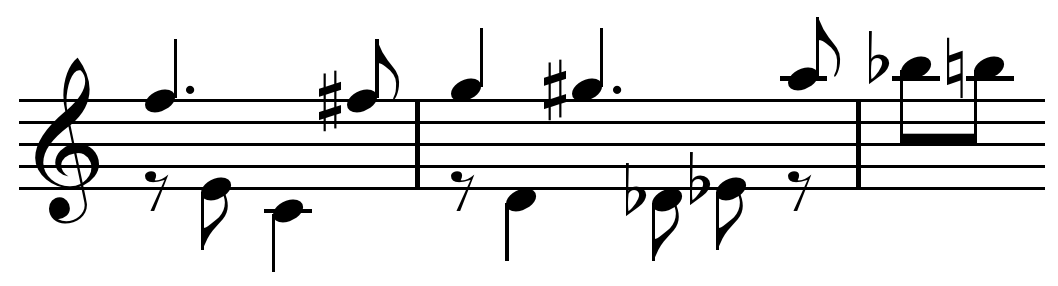

George Perle, gives

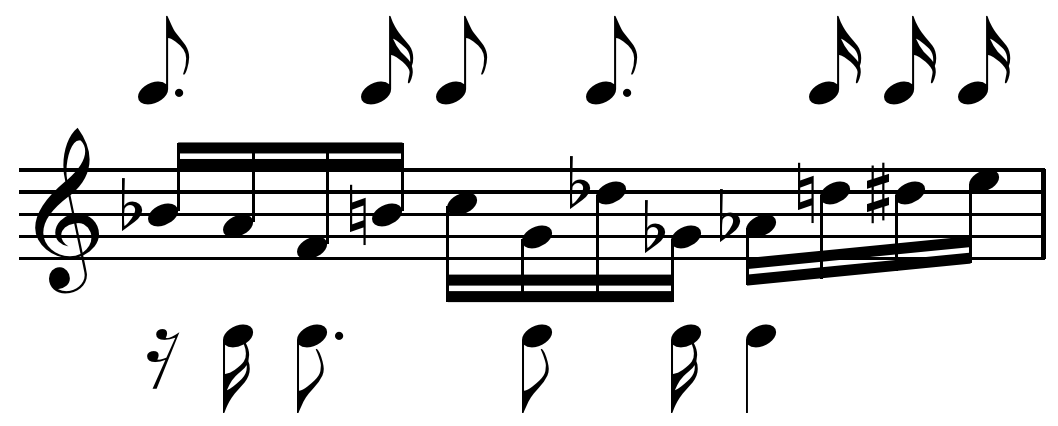

Despite assertions by Berg and others, George Perle, however, "had not yet been informed, as Leibowitz and Redlich were by the time they came to write their respective books, that everything in the 'strictly' dodecaphonic first movement had to be derived from a single serial ordering of the twelve notes of the chromatic scale." Rather, he, "recognized that the first three chords unfold tetrachordal segments of a single statement of the cycle of fifths (C7), and that at the bottom of the same page, in bars 7–9, the cello presents a linear statement of the same cycle." The second violin unfolds "the initial tetrachordal segmentation of the perfect-5th cycle," again at the beginning of the recapitulation. He asks: "How could one [think] of the initial bar as 'disordered'? If anything is to be designated as an Urform here, surely it is this perfect-5th cycle, given its background role in relation to the tone row and other components of the movement."

=== VI. Largo desolato ===
In the sixth movement, tone row 1 is

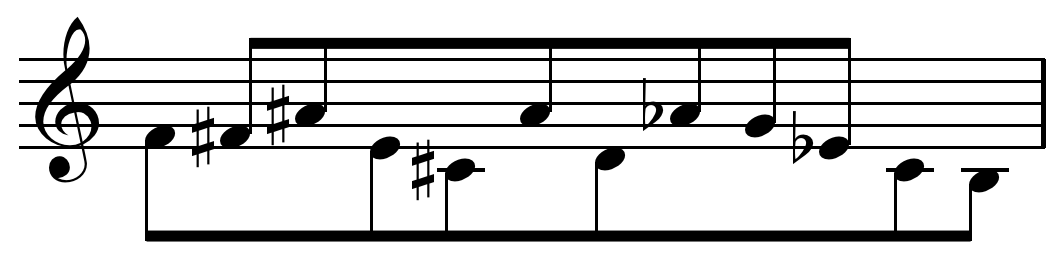

while tone row 2, derived from tone row 1, is

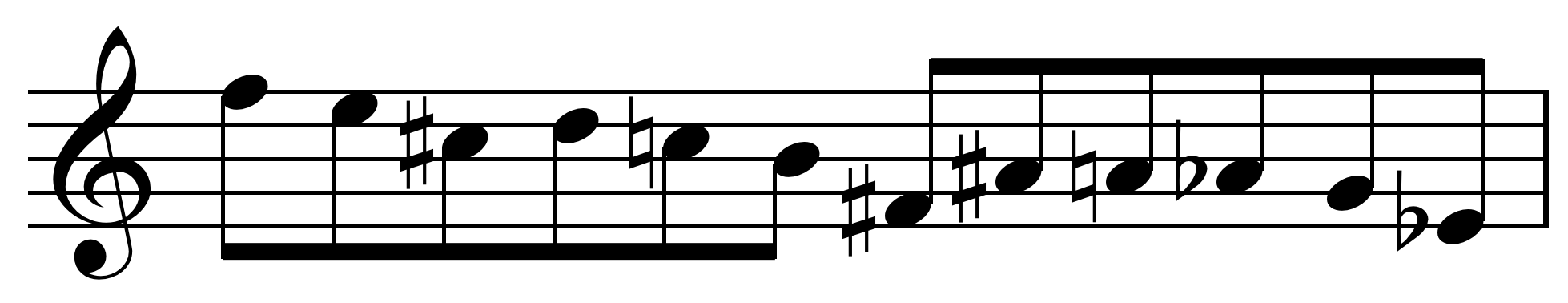

== Version for string orchestra ==
In 1928, Berg arranged the second, third and fourth movements of the Lyric Suite for string orchestra. According to Adorno:

If the lyrical nature of the Suite is best fostered in the quartet, its dramatic nature is best fostered in the string tutti; only here are its contours dissolved as completely and enigmatically as the accompanimental concept of the sound demands; and only here does the paroxysm attain its full catastrophic force.

== Recordings ==
The piece has been recorded by and released on:

- Galimir Quartet (ca. 1935). Alban Berg, Suite Lyrique pour quatuor à cordes. 4-disc, 78-rpm set. Polydor 595.135 (disc 1); Polydor 595.136 (disc 2); Polydor 595.137 (disc 3); Polydor 595.138 (disc 4). Reissued Chicago, 1937: Brunswick Polydor BP-2 (95006, 95007, 95008, 95009). Reissued 1991 as part of a compilation, Récital du Quatuor Galimir, with Maurice Ravel, String Quartet in F major; Darius Milhaud, String Quartets No. 7, op. 87. Cassette tape recording. Armand Panigel Foundation 15. This compilation reissued 1999 as The Galimir Quartet of Vienna: The Polydor Recordings, 1934–35. CD recording. New York, NY: Rockport Records, RR5007. Lyric Suite reissued in 1991 in another compilation, Webern conducts Berg, with Berg's Violin Concerto (Louis Krasner, violin, BBC Symphony Orchestra, cond. Anton Webern). [London]: Continuum, SBT 1004.
- Galimir Quartet (1983). Alban Berg Lyric Suite 1926; String Quartet, op. 3. LP recording. Vanguard VA-25017. Cassette recording. Vanguard CVA-25017.
- Pro Arte Quartet (ca. 1960). Alban Berg: Lyric Suite. 12-inch LP recording. Dial 5.
- LaSalle Quartet (1958). Issued in 1996 on CD2 of 12-CD set, 75 Jahre Donaueschinger Musiktage 1921–1996. Col Legno WWE 12CD 31899.
- LaSalle Quartet (1972). Arnold Schoenberg, Alban Berg, Anton Webern: Die Streichquartette. 5-LP set. Deutsche Grammophon 2720 029 (2561 050 – 2561 054). Single-disc reissue as Alban Berg: Lyrische Suite für Streichquartett; Streichquartett, op. 3. 12-inch LP recording. Deutsche Grammophon 2530 283.
- LaSalle Quartet (1987) Neue Wiener Schule: Schoenberg, Berg, Webern Streichquartette. 4-CD set. Deutsche Grammophon 419 994-2 (419 995-2; 419 996-2; 419 997-2; 419 998-2).
- Arditti Quartet (1989 recording, 1994 release, 2000 reissue) Arditti Quartet Edition, Volume 1: Alban Berg. Naïve Montaigne MO 782119
- Juilliard String Quartet (1950). Alban Berg: Lyric Suite. 10-inch LP. Columbia ML 2148. Reissued as part of Arnold Schoenberg, Complete string Quartets, with Alban Berg, Lyric Suite; Anton Webern, Fünf Sätze für Streichquartett, op. 5. 3-CD set. [France?]: United Archives
- Ramor Quartet (1961). Alban Berg. Lyric Suite; Arnold Schoenberg: Verklärte Nacht. With Edith Lorincz (viola) and Zsolt Deaky (violoncello) in the Schoenberg. Music of Five Centuries. 12-inch LP recording. Vox DL 530. Lyric Suite reissued 1965 as part of: Alban Berg: Lyric Suite and String Quartet, op. 3, with the Kohon Quartet in op. 3. 12-inch LP recording. Turnabout TV 34021S.
- Juilliard String Quartet (1961). Alban Berg: Lyric Suite; Anton Webern: Fünf Sätze. 12-inch LP recording. RCA Victor LM 2531 (mono); LSC 2531 (stereo). Lyric Suite reissued in 2005 (together with Elliott Carter, Quartet No. 2, and William Schuman, Quartet No. 3) on CD as: Juilliard String Quartet plays Berg, Carter, Schuman. Testament SBT 1374.
- Juilliard String Quartet (1970). Ludwig van Beethoven, Quartetto op. 135; Alban Berg, Suite lirica. Recorded by Radiotelevisione della Svizzera Italiana, Ascona, Switzerland on 24 August 1970. Issued on CD in 1995, Ermitage ERM 160–2. Reissued on Aura Music AUR 167–2.
- Juilliard String Quartet (1996). Intimate Letters. Sony Classical SK 66840
- Alban Berg Quartett (1974). Alban Berg. Streichquartett, op. 3 (1910); Lyrische Suite: (1925/26). 12-inch LP recording. Telefunken 6.41301; Telefunken SAT 22 549.
- Artis-Quartett (1990). Karl Weigl: Streichquartett A-Dur, Op. 4; Alban Berg: Lyrische Suite. CD recording. Orfeo C 216 901 A
- Ludwig Quartet (1991). Alban Berg: Suite lyrique; Henri Dutilleux: Ainsi la nuit; Anton Webern: Langsamer Satz. CD recording. Timpani 1C1005.
- Vogler Quartet (1991). Alban Berg: Lyric Suite; Giuseppe Verdi: String Quartet in E minor. CD recording. RCA Victor Red Seal 09026-60855-2.
- Pražák Quartet and Vanda Tabery (1993). Arnold Schoenberg: String Quartet No. 1 in D minor, op. 7; Alban Berg: Lyric Suite. Praga PR 250 034. Lyric Suite reissued 2000, as part of Alban Berg: Quartet Op. 3, Lyric Suite.... Prajac Digital.
- Duke Quartet (1997). Alban Berg: Lyric Suite; Arnold Schoenberg: Verklärte Nacht. With Helen Kamminga (viola) and Sophie Harris (cello) in the Schoenberg. Collins Classics 15062.
- Leipzig String Quartet (2000). Alban Berg, Anton Webern: Complete String Quartets. Andreas Seidel, Tilman Büning (violins), Ivo Bauer (viola), Matthias Moosdorf (violoncello), Christiane Oelze (soprano). CD recording. MDG 307 0996-2.
- Kronos Quartet & Dawn Upshaw (2003). Berg: Lyric Suite. Nonesuch 79696-2.
- Schoenberg Quartet (2001). Alban Berg: Chamber Music, Complete. Chandos Records CHAN 9999.
- Oslo String Quartet (2003). Oslo String Quartet Plays Jean Sibelius, Hugo Wolf, Alban Berg. Geir Inge Lotsberg, Per Kristian Skalstad (violins), Are Sandbakken (viola), Øystein Sonstad (violoncello). CD recording. CPO 999 977-2.
- New Zealand String Quartet (2007). Alban Berg, String Quartet, op. 3, Lyric Suite; Hugo Wolf: Italienische Serenade. CD recording. Naxos 8.557374.
- Diotima Quartet (2010). Schoenberg, Webern, Berg. Arnold Schoenberg: String Quartet No. 2 in F-sharp Minor, op. 10, with soprano. Anton Webern: 6 bagatelles, op. 9, including an unpublished bagatelle Langsam: "Schmerz immer, Blick nach oben". Alban Berg: Lyric Suite, including Largo desolato: "De profundis clamavi" with voice, from a score annotated by Berg. With Sandrine Piau (soprano) and Marie-Nicole Lemieux (contralto). CD recording. Naïve V 5240.
- Tetzlaff Quartet (2014). Mendelssohn Quartet Op. 13 – Berg Lyric Suite. Christian Tetzlaff, Elisabeth Kufferath (violins), Hanna Weinmeister (viola), Tanja Tetzlaff (cello). CD recording. CAvi-music AVI8553266.
- Gerhard Quartet (2017). Schumann – Berg – Kurtág. Lluís Castán, Judit Bardolet Vilaró (violins), Miquel Jordà Saún (viola), Jesús Miralles Roger (cello). CD recording. Harmonia Mundi 916108DI.
- Leonkoro Quartet (2026). Out of Vienna. Jonathan Schwarz, Amelie Wallner (violins), Mayu Konoe (viola), Lukas Schwarz (cello). CD recording. Alpha 1196
