= String Quartet (Berg) =

Work of Alban Berg

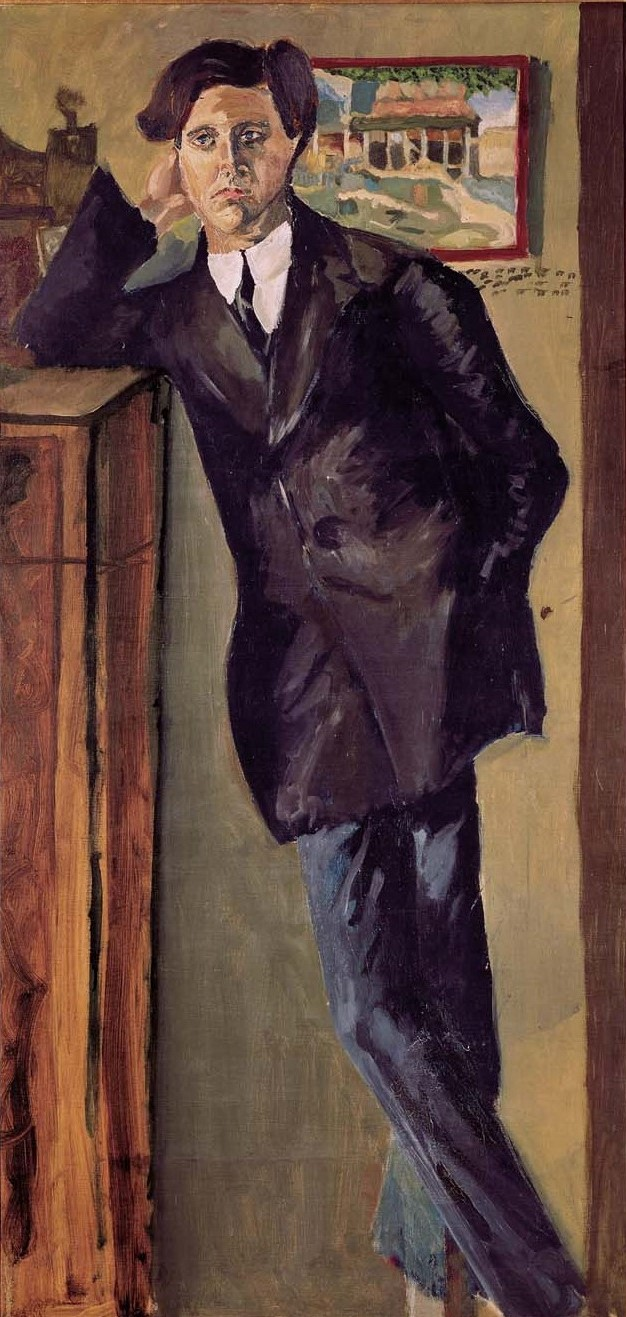
Painting of Alban Berg by Arnold Schoenberg, ca. 1910

The String Quartet, Op. 3, was composed by Alban Berg from 1909 to 1910.

== Background and music ==
From 1905 to 1907, Berg wrote many fugues, theme-and-variation sets, character pieces, and other short works, often for chamber strings or piano, to learn classical musical forms during his music theory studies with his mentor, Arnold Schoenberg. He finished Four Songs, Op. 2 around 1908 or 1909 and began a string quartet as his final apprentice piece.

Berg dated the work to 1909–1910. Schoenberg left no draft markings or suggested revisions as he had on Berg's student Sonatas 1–5 and Piano Sonata, Op. 1. Berg pursued his own originality, approaching form more freely than he had been able to do while learning.

He had completed the slow first movement and asked a quartet to read it for him by May 1910. He finished the more turbulent second movement that summer, creating an unusual two-movement form. Its style owes much to Romantic music, and it is more like Schoenberg's String Quartet No. 2, Op. 10 than Anton Webern's Five Movements, Op. 5 or Bagatelles, Op. 9.

== Reception ==
Violinist Fritz Brunner led the premiere on 24 April 1911 at the Vienna Musikverein, where it was paired with Berg's Piano Sonata.

Robert Lienau–Carl Haslinger published it in 1920. Berg paid for the music engraving. He made a piano four hands arrangement in 1921 (published 2007), perhaps for Schoenberg's Society for Private Musical Performances. He revised the quartet for Universal Edition to publish in 1925.

According to composer George Perle, it may have been the first extended composition based consistently on symmetrical pitch relations.
