= Irwin Gage =

American pianist (1939–2018)

Irwin Gage (September 4, 1939 – April 12, 2018) was an American pianist, specializing in accompanying Lieder.

== Biography ==
Born in Cleveland, Ohio, Gage studied piano at the University of Michigan with Eugene Bossart, and later at Yale with Ward Davenny. Other teachers included Erik Werba at the Vienna Music Academy and Hilde Langer-Rühl. He performed as a soloist with the Vienna Philharmonic in 1973, playing the solo piano part for Mozart's concert aria Ch'io mi scordi di te? with soprano Jessye Norman. Above all, he was a collaborator with singers such as Elly Ameling, Arleen Auger, Walter Berry, Brigitte Fassbaender, Dietrich Fischer-Dieskau, Gundula Janowitz, Christa Ludwig, Edda Moser, Dagmar Pecková, Lucia Popp, Hermann Prey, Christine Schäfer, Peter Schreier. From his work with such international elite singers numerous award-winning recordings emerged.

In 1970, he planned and accompanied an entire series of Lieder recitals at the Vienna Konzerthaus. From 1979 to 2005, Gage headed a song interpretation class at the Academy of Music and Theater in Zurich (now Zurich University of the Arts). In 2001, he was also appointed to a professorship for song interpretation at the Saarbrücken Music Academy, where he initiated a nationally unique program entitled "Song Duo."

Irwin Gage gave master classes in Europe, Japan, and the United States. He was a consultant and artistic director of concert series at various houses, including the Cologne Philharmonic. He sat on many juries for singing, song duo, chamber music, and solo piano at international music competitions.

== Death ==
Gage died in Zurich, Switzerland on April 12, 2018, after a long period of physical impairment and illness. He was 78.
