= Hanna Fuchs-Robettin =

Austro-Hungarian mistress of Alban Berg

Hanna Fuchs-Robettin (née Werfel; 1896–1964) was the sister of Franz Werfel, wife of Herbert Fuchs-Robettin, and mistress of Alban Berg. Berg secretly and cryptically dedicated his Lyric Suite to her.

== Early life ==
Born in Prague (then part of the Austro-Hungarian Empire), Hanna was the second of three children of Rudolf Werfel, a wealthy manufacturer of gloves and leather goods. Her mother, Albine Kussi, was the daughter of a mill owner. Her brother Franz was born in 1890 and her sister Marianne Amalie was born in 1899. Her father's ancestors were German-Bohemian Jews, including a great grandfather who had served in Napoleon's Russian campaign as a courier. Her grandfather had come to Prague where he made and lost a fortune. His son (Hanna's father) rebuilt the family wealth. Hanna grew up in a stylish house on Marienstrasse in the New Town where the children were nurtured by a Czech Catholic woman named Babi. Babi would take the children with her to church and the family made regular attendance at the Maisel Synagogue. The Werfels were assimilated Jews with a strong interest in music and theatre, which they attended often.

== Adulthood ==
Hanna married Herbert Fuchs-Robettin and had two children: Munzo (born about 1917) and Dorothea (known as Dodo). Hanna was known by the nickname Mopinka. Her husband was a Prague industrialist with a great enthusiasm for music.

In May 1925 Hanna began an affair with a friend of her husband, the Austrian composer Alban Berg. Over the next year Berg wrote his Lyric Suite, which used a combination of his initials and those of Hanna (HF) as well as a melodic quote from Alexander von Zemlinsky's Lyric Symphony, which originally set the words "You are mine own". He gave an annotated copy of the score to Hanna, who bequeathed it to her daughter Dorothea. This score is now in the Austrian National Library. The annotation reads in part:

It has also, my Hanna, allowed me other freedoms! For example, that of secretly inserting our initials, HF and AB, into the music, and relating every movement and every section of every movement to our numbers, 10 and 23. I have written these, and much that has other meanings, into the score for you. ... May it be a small monument to a great love.

In 1976 fourteen of Berg's letters to Hanna were discovered in her papers. Some had been carried between them by Theodor Adorno and by Alma Mahler-Werfel.

Berg died in 1935. Hanna and Herbert fled Prague to escape Nazi persecution as Jews and moved to New York City. Her husband died in 1949 aged 63. She survived him by nearly 15 years.
