= Kammerkonzert (Berg) =

Double concerto for piano and violin by Alban Berg

- für Klavier und Geige mit 13 Bläsern
- Concertante music by Alban Berg
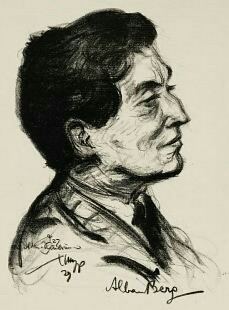
- The composer, sketched by Emil Stumpp in 1927
- Composed: 1923–25
- Published: 19 March 1927
- Movements: three
- Scoring: piano; violin; 13 wind instruments

The Kammerkonzert für Klavier und Geige mit 13 Bläsern (Chamber Concerto for Piano and Violin with 13 Wind Instruments) is a piece of chamber music composed by Austrian composer Alban Berg. It was composed between 1923 and 1925. The short score was completed on 9 February 1925; the full score was finished on 23 July 1925. The work was premiered on 19 March 1927.

== Structure ==
The work is scored for piano and violin soloists accompanied by a wind ensemble of 13: piccolo, flute, oboe, English horn, E♭ clarinet, A clarinet, bass clarinet, bassoon, contrabassoon, two French horns, trumpet, and trombone.

It is in three movements:

1. Thema scherzoso con variazioni
2. Adagio
3. Rondo ritmico con introduzione

According to AllMusic, the concerto is "remarkable for the thoroughness of its organization; that is, it was composed with rigorous attention to minute details, and its structure is derived from a series of complex mathematical relationships. For example, the first movement's 240 measures consist of 30 and 60 measure variations, the second is 240 measures, and the third is the length of the previous two at 480 measures."

=== I. Thema scherzoso con variazioni ===
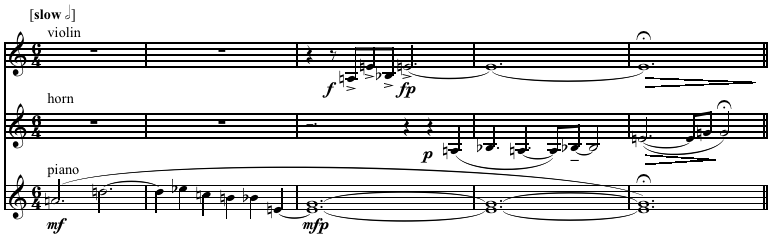
The Chamber Concerto opening clearly displays the Second Viennese School "initials" themes.

The first movement involves mainly the piano and the 13 wind instruments (with a brief appearance by the solo violin). For the theme of the movement, Berg uses German notation to musically spell out the names of himself and his two friends and fellow members of the Second Viennese School:

Arnold Schoenberg (in the German spelling) ArnolD SCHönBErG → A–D–E♭–C–B–B♭–E–G
Anton wEBErn → A–E–B♭–E
AlBAn BErG → A–B♭–A–B♭–E–G

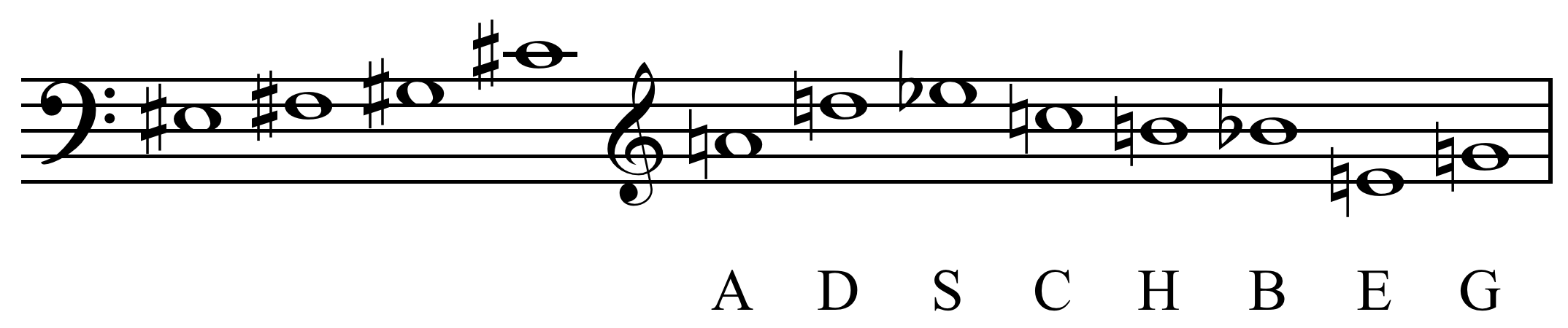
Tone row with Schoenberg's initials preceded by remaining four notes

The work was composed for Arnold Schoenberg's 50th birthday, and it is his "name" that Berg creates a 12-note row out of, prefixing it by the 'missing' notes of the chromatic scale. This theme is then treated to five variations, using the common manipulations of twelve-tone technique:

- Var. 1 – Prime
- Var. 2 – Retrograde
- Var. 3 – Inversion
- Var. 4 – Retrograde inversion

=== II. Adagio ===
The second movement is a large palindrome, using primarily the Prime form of the row in the first half and the Retrograde row in the second half. The movement focuses primarily on the solo violin and 13 winds, though the turning point of the palindrome is marked by a brief appearance of the solo piano. In 1935, Berg arranged this movement as a separate piece for piano, violin and clarinet.

=== III. Rondo ritmico con introduzione ===
The third movement involves both soloists and the ensemble, and is a large rondo based on a returning rhythmic, rather than melodic, idea. Berg layers material from the first and second movements on top of each other in this final movement. There is a repeat of almost 175 measures in the movement that is often omitted in performances and recordings.
