= Piano Sonata (Berg) =

Piano sonata in one movement of A. Berg

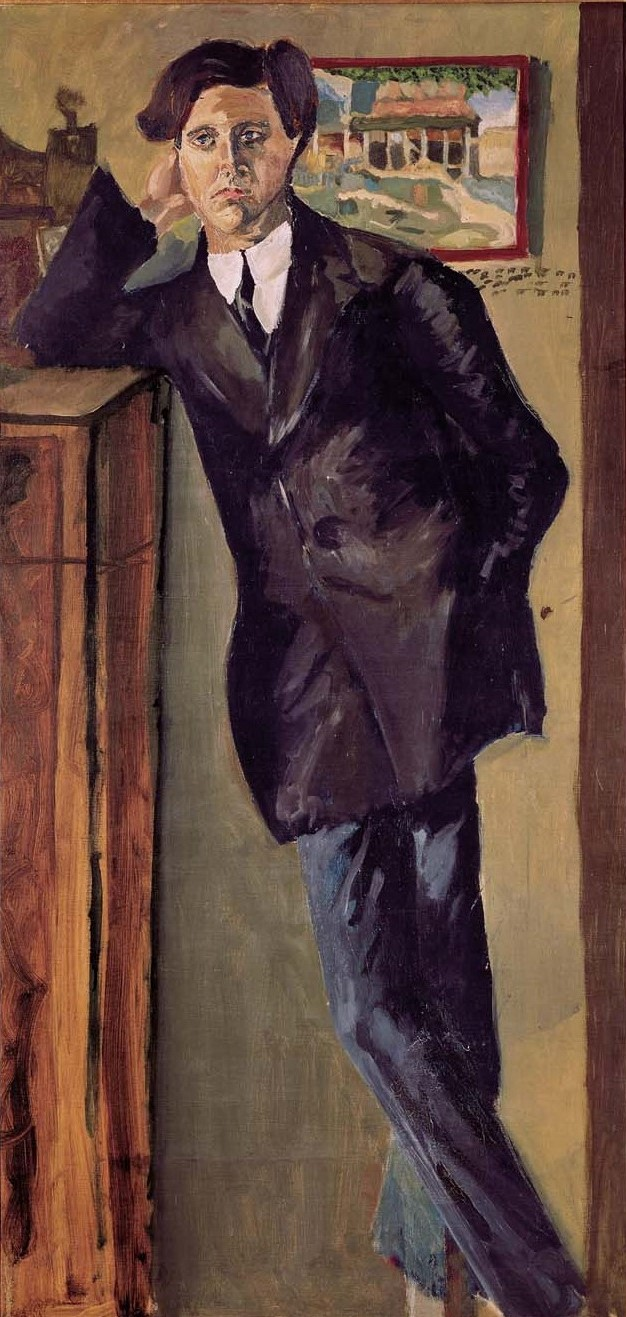
Painting of Alban Berg by Arnold Schoenberg, ca. 1910

Alban Berg's Piano Sonata (German: Klaviersonate), Op. 1, is a piano work first published in 1910. The exact date of composition is unknown; sources suggest that it was written in 1909.

== History ==
Berg first studied under Arnold Schoenberg in the autumn of 1904, taking lessons in harmony and counterpoint. Later, from autumn 1907, he returned to begin studies in composition, which ended with the study of sonata movements. Several draft sketches of sonata movements date from this period and it is thought that Op. 1 followed from these drafts. The exact date of composition is unknown; although the second reissue of the score bears the date 1908, sources suggest that the sonata was not composed until the spring or summer of 1909.

Piano Sonata, Op. 1 was published in 1910 along with a set of lieder, Op. 2. Berg financed the publication of the sonata himself. The premiere was performed in Vienna on 24 April 1911 by Etta Werndorff, at a concert whose programme also included Berg's String Quartet, Op. 3. After World War I, Eduard Steuermann performed the sonata at several concerts arranged by the Verein für musikalische Privataufführungen, and its popularity increased after the success of Berg's opera Wozzeck in the late 1920s.

The work underwent alterations for republication in 1920, but this version is now lost. In 1925 the publisher requested revisions from Berg in order to produce a "revised edition", partly to facilitate the acquisition of a copyright in the United States of America, and also to capitalise on Berg's growing international reputation. The revisions were mainly to phrasing.

== Composition and structure ==
The sonata is not in the typical classical form of three or four contrasting movements, but consists of a single movement centered in the key of B minor. Berg originally intended for the Sonata to be a more traditional multi-movement work, the opening movement followed by a slow movement and a finale. However, for a long period he lacked any ideas for these other movements. Berg turned to Schoenberg, who commented that the lack of inspiration indicated that Berg had "said all there was to say". Following Schoenberg's advice, Berg decided to publish the finished movement on its own.

Although the piece has the nominal key of B minor, Berg makes frequent use of chromaticism, whole-tone scales, and wandering key centers, giving the tonality a very unstable feel, which only resolves in the final few bars. The structure of the piece is traditional sonata form, with an exposition, development and recapitulation; however, the composition also relies heavily on Arnold Schoenberg's idea of "developing variation", a method to ensure the unity of a piece of music by deriving all aspects of a composition from a single idea. In this case, much of the composition can be traced back to the two opening gestures.
