= Johannes Schlaf =

German author and translator

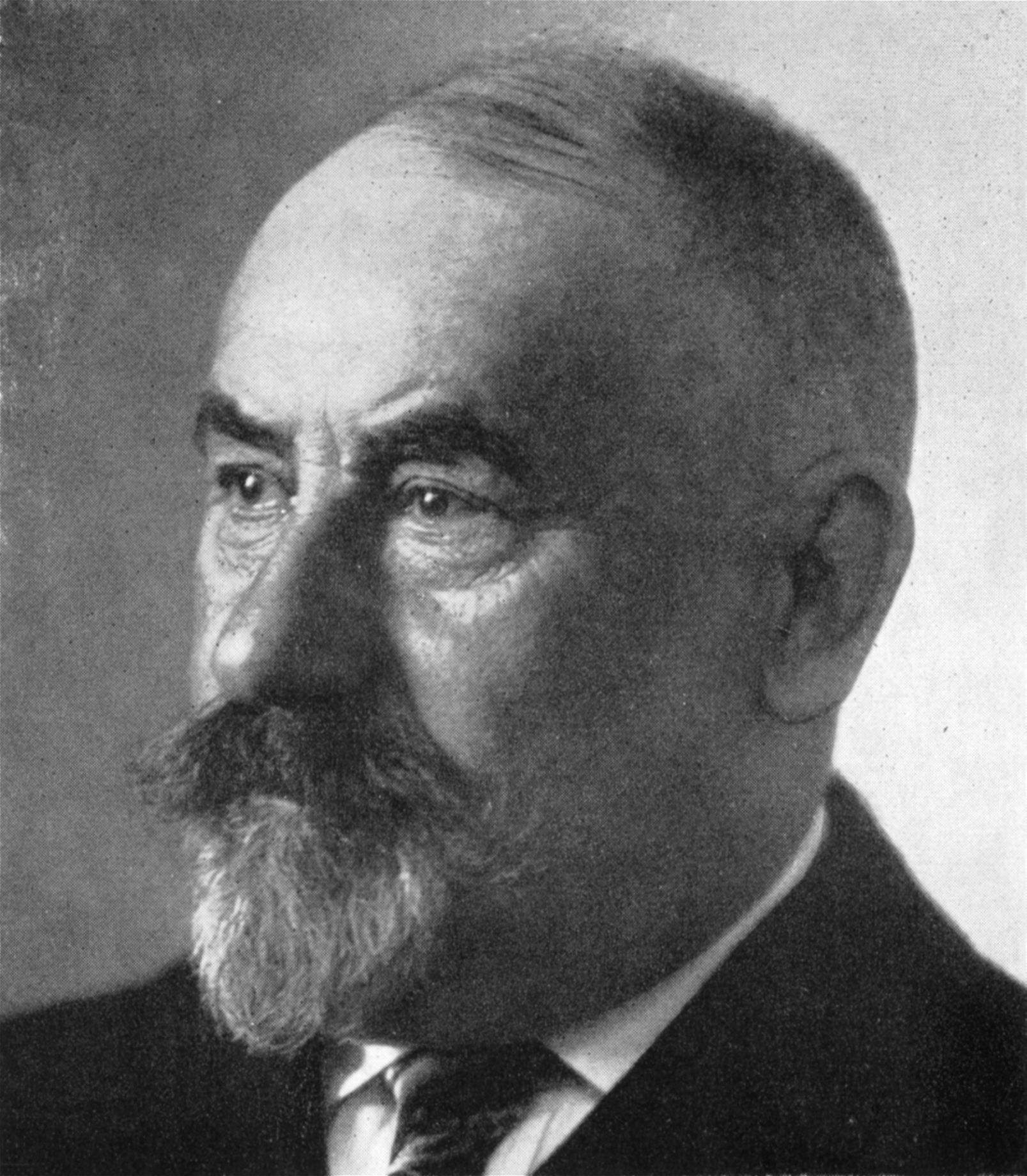
Johannes Schlaf, 1910

Johannes Schlaf (21 June 1862 in Querfurt – 2 February 1941 in Querfurt) was a German playwright, author, and translator and an important exponent of Naturalism. As a translator he was important for exposing the German-speaking world to the works of Walt Whitman, Émile Verhaeren and Émile Zola and is known as a founder of the "Whitman Cult" in Germany. His literary achievements lie foremost in the scenic-dialogue innovations of "sequential naturalism" and in the formalization of literary impressionism. He also contributed to the emergence of the "intimate theater."

Some of his poems have been set to music by composers Alban Berg and Arnold Schoenberg.

He is sometimes mistakenly cited for coining the term "The Third Reich" in relation to Nazism because of his 1906 novel by that name. The Nazi use of the term comes from a 1923 book Das Dritte Reich by Arthur Moeller van den Bruck.

== Childhood ==
Schlaf was the son of a commercial clerk in Querfurt, a town in Saxony-Anhalt. Because his family lived in cramped quarters, he lived temporarily with his grandparents. His Grandmother, an educated woman, supported him in his passion for art and literature at an early age. In an autobiographical sketch from 1902, Schlaf claimed to have written verses and puppet shows at the age of 12 and short stories while an adolescent. He also showed a talent for drawing. In 1875, Schlaf's father took a job in a construction business in the emerging industrialism of nearby Magdeburg. Schlaf returned to his family where his father enforced a strict regime, and where Schalf felt more fear than affection.

== Education ==
From 1875 to 1884 Schlaf attended the cathedral school in Magdeburg, joining a student club, "Covenant of the Living" in 1882. With this club he encountered recent writings in the fields of philosophy, science, and literature. In 1884 he graduated and went to study in Halle, the largest city in Saxony-Anhalt. His program of study was theology, German, classicism, and philosophy, but he was more engaged in connecting with other students than his studies. His earliest publications date from his time in Halle.

He moved to study in Berlin 1885 and in 1886 joined the literary group Durch of young naturalist writers including Gerhart Hauptmann, Arno Holz, and William Bölsche. Throughout his studies he felt torn between his studies and the urge to devote himself entirely to writing. . During this time Schlaf developed a friendship with Arno Holz and around 1887 he agreed to an offer from Holz to share a vacant summer home of a friend from Niederschoenhausen and from there work on his writing. It was then he broke off his formal studies.

== Early work with Arno Holz ==
Schlaf and Holz presented their first joint work, the anthology, "New Tracks" in 1892. In it the term "Sequential Naturalism" (Konsequenter Naturalismus) made its first appearance. The anthology consisted of three parts, each with its own preface. The middle part had been published in 1889 under the pseudonym Bjarne B. Holmsen. It contained the short story "Papa Hamlet." The third part of the anthology, the drama "The Family Selicke" had been published in 1890.

In Sequential Naturalism, one encounters a moment-to-moment description of events without a governing overarching narrative or perceiver. The style is also called the "Sekundenstil" or second-by-second style. In Papa Hamlet, the story is told almost entirely in dialogue, much of it in dialect. There is almost no intervention by the narrator. Dialogue contains contradictions, grammatical inaccuracies, dialect, other elements of a "realist" atmosphere. The works in the story center on broken families, alcoholism, financial hardship, and sickness. The observance of unity of place and time in the narrative give the works an oppressive atmosphere.

The Family Selicke found little success at first when it was first staged in April 1890. It did have its defenders, however.

Holz and Schlaf felt increasing alienation through the 1890s, with early tensions over artistic notions exacerbated by public debate over the relative contributions and merit of both writers. The dispute reached its climate between 1905 and 1906. Today, Schlaf's esteem pales in comparison to Holz's – a situation convenient given Schlaf's support of the Nazis in the 1930s (Holz died in 1928 before the Nazi rise to power).

== At the turn of the century ==
In 1893 Schlaf suffered from a nervous breakdown and was admitted to Charité, a Berlin hospital. He sustained several visits to the hospital by 1897 and later described his illness as a nervous disorder and depression. Holz used these experiences to discredit his former friend and wrote about his paranoia. In Schalf's novels published after 1900 one can find representations of schizophrenic and psychotic behavior. He also started to investigate the occult and cosmology.

Schlaf published his first independent drama, "Meister Oelze" in 1892, which received its Berlin premiere on 2 February 1894. The play was widely successful. It shows many of the features found in "New Tracks," but also a focus on internal psychological processes. He produced several other dramas through the 1890s, with his last published play, "Weigand" appearing in 1906. Between 1900 and 1914 Schlaf wrote ten novels. His works show the influence of his readings of Whitman and Ernst Haeckel as well as traces of turn of the century decadence.

In 1904, Schlaf moved to Weimar.

== During the Weimar Republic ==
Germany's defeat in the First World War was a great blow to national pride, but they did not significantly alter the ideas developed by Schlaf. Like other authors of the period, he threw himself into his literary work – devoting himself to philosophical and cosmological speculation. During the war he had developed ideas connecting war with evolutionary selection as well as patriotic ideas of German cultural hegemony.

During this time there developed a contradiction between the relative lack of success of his recent writings and the growth of his public recognition. Especially during birthdays, Schlaf was celebrated in public ceremonies, commemorated in the naming of streets, the foundation of a "Society of the Friends of Johannes Schlaf" and the construction of a museum.

== During the Third Reich ==
In the 1930s Schalf confessed to the creed of National Socialism. Before the First World War, Schlaf's naturalism extended into racial aspects, but the vague concept of a Germanic race could apply to virtually every European nation. After the war, Schlaf's notions of biological evolution extended to the superiority of the German people. After the Nazi takeover in May 1933, Schlaf was appointed to the "cleaned" Prussian Academy of Arts.. In October of that year, Schlaf was among the 88 writers who signed the "vow of most faithful allegiance." He aligned with the Nazis to his death.

Schlaf returned to Querfurt in 1937. His late writings focused on the Geocentric model and cosmological speculation and remain mostly unpublished. He continued to be honored by numerous awards in his late age, especially for his early works as a naturalist writer. He died at age 78, and high representatives from the National Socialist government attended his funeral.

His papers are held by the State Library in Dortmund.

== Selected works ==
- Detlev von Liliencron
- Papa Hamlet, with Arno Holz, 1889 (originally published under the pseudonym Bjarne P. Holmsen)
- Die Familie Selicke, Drama, with Arno Holz, 1890
- In Dingsda, Prose verse, 1892
- Meister Oelze, Drama, 1892
- Gertrud, Drama, 1898
- Die Feindlichen, Drama, 1898
- Stille Welten. Neue Stimmungen aus Dingsda, 1899
- Der Bann, Drama, 1900
- Das dritte Reich, Novel, 1900
- Die Suchenden, Novel, 1902
- Peter Boites Freite, Roman, 1903
- Der Kleine, Roman, 1904
- Weigand, Drama, 1906
- Kritik der Taineschen Kunsttheorie, 1906
- Der Prinz, Roman, 1908
- Am toten Punkt, Roman, 1909
- Aufstieg, Roman, 1911
- Religion und Kosmos, 1911
- Mieze. Der Roman eines freien Weibes, Roman, 1912
- Das Recht der Jugend, Erzählung, 1913
- Tantchen Mohnhaupt und Anderes. Dingsda-Geschichten, 1913
- Professor Plassmann und das Sonnenfleckenphänomen. Weiteres zur geozentrischen Feststellung, 1914
- Auffallende Unstichhaltigkeit des fachmännischen Einwandes. Zur geozentrischen Feststellung, 1914
- Mutter Lise, Roman, 1917
- Zwei Erzählungen, 1918
- Die Erde – nicht die Sonne. Das geozentrische Weltbild, 1919
- Gedichte in Prosa, 1920
- Miele. Ein Charakterbild, 1920
- Die Greisin. Vorfrühling, Stories, 1921
- Die Wandlung, Novel, 1922
- Das Gottlied, 1922
- Seele, 1922
- Ein Wildgatter schlag' ich hinter mir zu … Vaterländisches aus Dingsda, 1922
- Radium, Stories, 1922
- Die Wandlung, Stories, 1922
- Der Weihnachtswunsch und anderes. Neue Erzählungen aus Dingsda, 1924
- Deutschland, 1925
- Die Nacht der Planeten, 1925
- Die andere Dimension, Stories, 1926
- Die Mutter, Poems, 1927
- Das Spiel der hohen Linien, Poems, 1927
- Kosmos und kosmischer Umlauf. Die geozentrische Lösung des kosmischen Problems, 1927
- Die Sonnenvorgänge, 1930
- Neues aus Dingsda, 1933
- Zur Aprioritätenlehre Kants, 1934
- Vom höchsten Wesen, 1935
- Ein wichtigstes astronomisches Problem und seine Lösung, 1937
- Aus meinem Leben. Erinnerungen, 1941

== Bibliography (in English) ==
- Raleigh Whitinger: Johannes Schlaf and German naturalist drama. Columbia: Camden House 1997. (= Studies in German literature, linguistics, and culture) ISBN 1-57113-107-8
- Frisch, Walter, "German Modernism" (Berkeley: University of California Press, 2004) pp 39–43.
