= Wolfgang Martin Stroh =

German musicologist

Wolfgang Martin Stroh (born 1 July 1941) is a German musicologist and Emeritus professor at the Carl von Ossietzky Universität Oldenburg.

== Life ==
Born in Stuttgart, Stroh studied mathematics, physics, musicology and modern German literature at the Universities of Erlangen, Munich, Freiburg and at the Eastman School of Music (Rochester). In 1973 he obtained his doctorate with Hans Heinrich Eggebrecht (Freiburg). In 2006 he acquired the HAF diploma for multimedia design. He was a teacher at several Gymnasiums. From 1973 to 1978 he was research fellow at the Oberstufen-Kolleg Bielefeld. Since 1978, a Professor for systematic musicology at the University of Oldenburg. In the Intercultural music education he has become known for his "extended interface approach".

== Publications ==
- Anton Webern. Historische Legitimation als kompositorisches Problem. (Göppinger Akademische Beiträge 63). Verlag Kümmerle, Göppingen 1973.
- Zur Soziologie der elektronischen Musik. Amadeus-Verlag, Zürich 1975.
- Leben Ja. Zur Psychologie musikalischer Tätigkeit. Musik in Kellern, auf Plätzen und vor Natodraht. Marohl-Verlag, Stuttgart 1984. ISBN 3-89006-021-8.
- with Ralf Nebhuth: Carmen. Begründungen und Unterrichtsmaterialien (Szenische Interpretation von Opern, Band 1). Lugert-Verlag, Oldershausen 1990. ISBN 3-930915-16-2.
- Handbuch New Age Musik. Auf der Suche nach neuen musikalischen Erfahrungen. (ConBrio Fachbuch Band 1). Verlag ConBrio, Regensburg 1994. ISBN 3-930079-40-2.
- Szenische Interpretation von Musik. Eine Anleitung zur Entwicklung von Spielkonzepten anhand ausgewählter Beispiele. (Norbert Schläbitz (ed.): EinFach Musik, vol. 3). Schöningh-Verlag, Paderborn 2007. ISBN 978-3-14-018077-1.
- With Margherita D’Amelio: Tarantella in der Schule. Eine multimediale Lernumgebung. starfish music Production, Bremen 2012 / Lugert-Verlag, Oldershausen 2012. DVD 027191–670245.
