= Altenberg Lieder =

Song cycle by Alban Berg

- Orchestral songs by Alban Berg
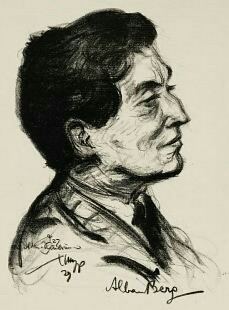
- The composer, sketched by Emil Stumpp in 1927
- Native name: Fünf Orchesterlieder nach Ansichtskarten von Peter Altenberg
- Opus: 4
- Text: Postcards by Peter Altenberg
- Language: German
- Performed: March 31, 1913
- Movements: 5
- Scoring: Medium voice; orchestra

Alban Berg's Five Orchestral Songs after Postcards by Peter Altenberg (German: Fünf Orchesterlieder nach Ansichtskarten von Peter Altenberg), Op. 4, were composed in 1911 and 1912 for medium voice, or mezzo-soprano. They are considered a true song cycle, unlike his previous two groups of songs, the Sieben frühe Lieder of 1908 and the Vier Gesänge, Op. 2, of 1910, and they are his first work for orchestra. The postcard texts by contemporary Viennese poet Peter Altenberg recount the stormy but beautiful condition of the soul and the palpable sensations of love and longing. The highly imaginative music responds with many displaced ostinati and a conflicted, lyrical passion.

When two of the songs (Numbers 2 and 3) were performed for the first time – on 31 March 1913 under the baton of Berg's mentor Arnold Schoenberg in Vienna's Musikverein – members of the audience were so taken aback as to erupt in a famous riot, wounding the composer's feelings so deeply that he never again sought a performance for them.

== Structure ==
The songs are:

1. "Seele, wie bist du schöner" ("Soul, how much more beautiful are you")
2. "Sahst du nach dem Gewitterregen den Wald?" ("Did you see the forest after the rainstorm?")
3. "Über die Grenzen des All" ("Beyond the boundaries of the universe")
4. "Nichts ist gekommen" ("Nothing has come")
5. "Hier ist Friede" ("Here is peace")

== Instrumentation ==
The work is scored for medium voice (mezzo-soprano) and a large orchestra consisting of:

Woodwinds

3 flutes (3rd doubling piccolo)
3 oboes (3rd doubling English horn)
3 clarinets in B♭ (3rd doubling clarinet in E♭)
1 bass clarinet in B♭
3 bassoons (3rd doubling contrabassoon)

Brass
4 horns in F
3 trumpets in F
4 trombones (1st doubling alto trombone)
1 tuba (doubling contrabass tuba)

Percussion

timpani

glockenspiel
xylophone
triangle
cymbals
tam-tam
side drum
bass drum

Keyboards

celesta
piano
harmonium

Strings

harp

violins I, II
violas
celli
double basses
