= Schließe mir die Augen beide =

"Schließe mir die Augen beide" is a poem by Theodor Storm from his 1851 collection Sommergeschichten und Lieder (Summer Stories and Songs).

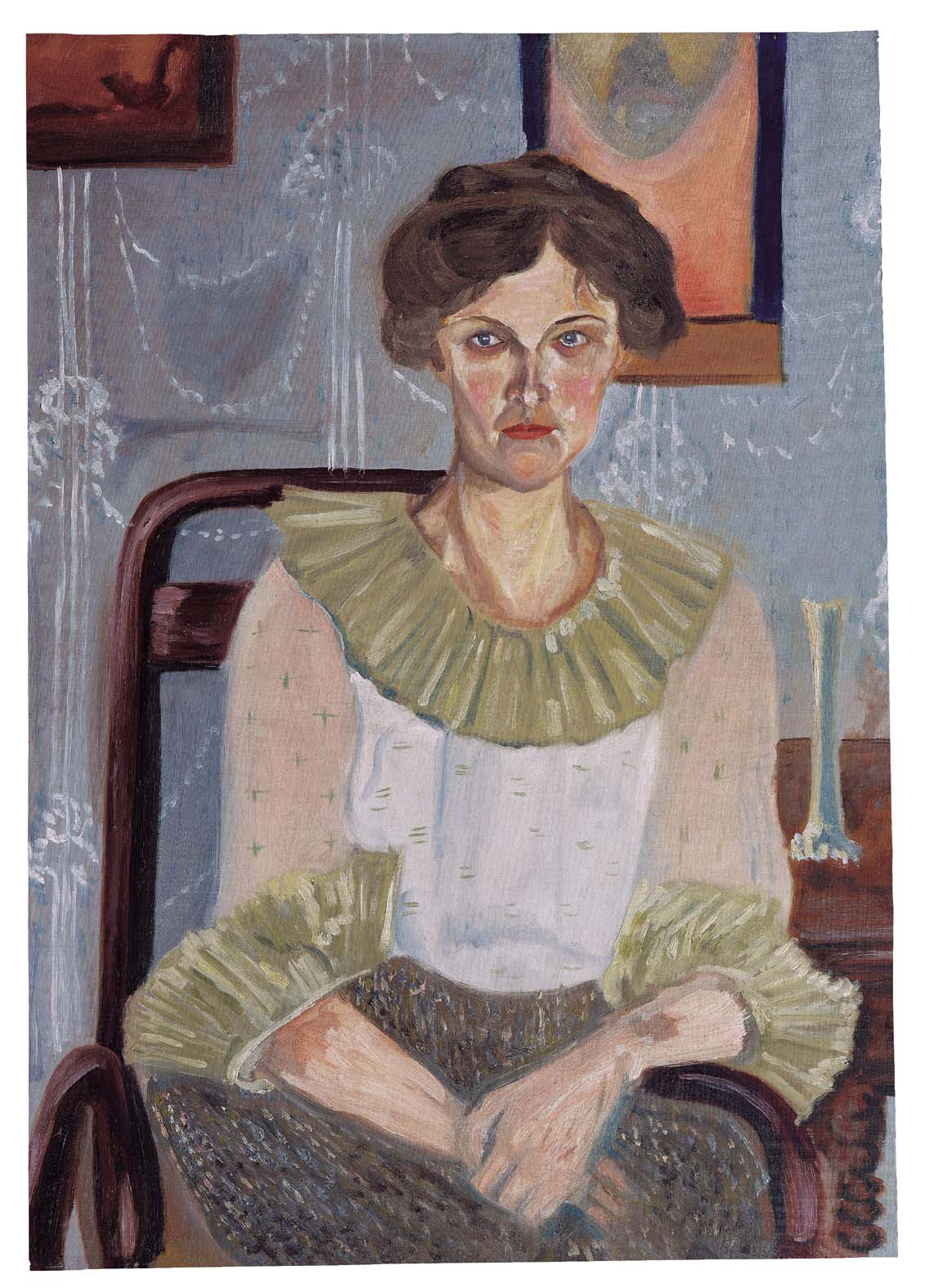
Helene Nahowski (1910), by Arnold Schoenberg

It was twice set to music by Alban Berg. Berg composed his first setting in 1907, dedicating it to his future wife, Helene Nahowski. The second version was composed in 1925 to celebrate the 25th anniversary of the Universal Edition music publisher. This second setting was Berg's first full-fledged 12 tone composition, and he re-used its tone row, or rather its secondary set, in the first movement of the Lyric Suite for string quartet of 1926.

The text is as follows:

Schließe mir die Augen beide
mit den lieben Händen zu!
Geht doch Alles, was ich leide,
unter deiner Hand zur Ruh.

Und wie leise sich der Schmerz
Well' um Welle schlafen leget,
wie der letzte Schlag sich reget,
füllest du mein ganzes Herz.

Close both my eyes
with your beloved hands!
Let all my suffering
gain rest beneath your hand.

And as gently the pain
wave upon wave lies in sleep,
As the last blow falls
you fill my whole heart.
