= Alban Berg =

Austrian composer (1885–1935)

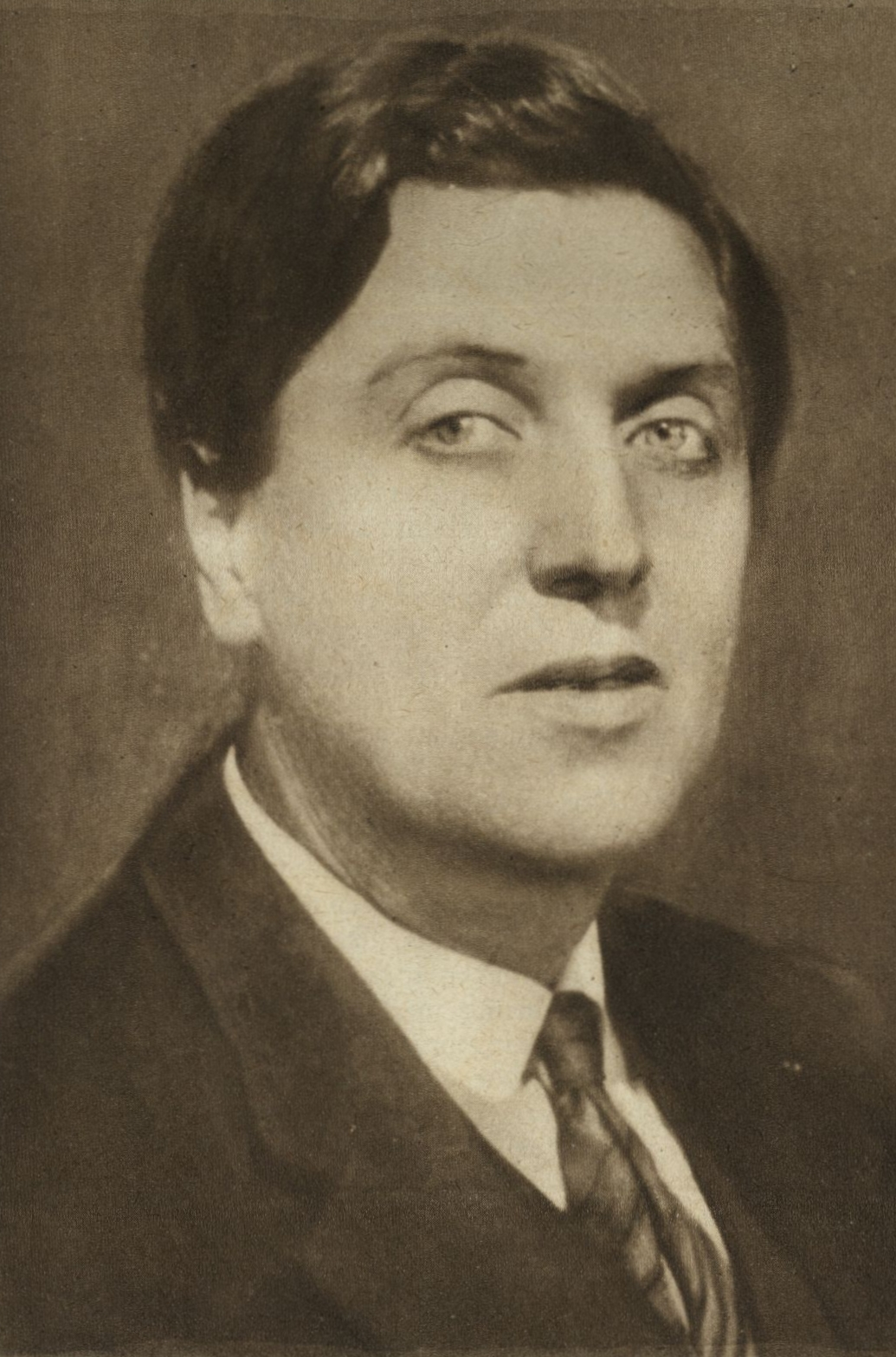
- Berg c. 1930
- Born: Alban Maria Johannes Berg; 9 February 1885; Vienna, Austria-Hungary
- Died: 24 December 1935 (aged 50); Vienna, Austria
- Occupation: Composer
- Works: List of compositions
- Spouse: Helene Nahowski (m. 1911)

Alban Maria Johannes Berg (/bɛərɡ/ BAIRG; Austrian German: [ˈalbaːn ˈbɛrg]; 9 February 1885 – 24 December 1935) was an Austrian composer of the Second Viennese School. His compositional style combined Romantic lyricism with the twelve-tone technique. Although he left a relatively small oeuvre, he is remembered as one of the most important composers of the 20th century for his expressive style encompassing "entire worlds of emotion and structure".

Berg was born and lived in Vienna. He began to compose at the age of fifteen. He studied counterpoint, music theory and harmony with Arnold Schoenberg between 1904 and 1911, and adopted his principles of developing variation and the twelve-tone technique. Berg's major works include the operas Wozzeck (1914–1922) and Lulu (from 1928; finished posthumously), the chamber pieces Lyric Suite and Chamber Concerto, as well as a Violin Concerto. He also composed a number of songs (lieder).

Berg died from sepsis in 1935. He is said to have brought more "human values" to the twelve-tone system; his works are seen as more "emotional" than those of Schoenberg. His music had a surface glamour that won him admirers when Schoenberg himself had few.

== Life and career ==
=== Early life ===
[... T]here are things that can't be measured by the yardstick of Nature – – things that have sprung solely from the human spirit, towering far above the material world—things that are real only in our longing for them, 'when the sublime and beautiful things, the good and wise things, that we long for, turn into reality—not a reality that can be picked and put in the mouth or that can be counted and put in one's pocket!' (Otto Ernst).
Music is like that – – – and quite a few literary works that are written from within a longing-filled heart! – – : – –
– I've now got to A Doll's House. ...

Berg wrote in a typically freewheeling manner to share his reading of Ibsen's A Doll's House with Watznauer on 18 October 1906, here quoting from Ernst's Meersymphonie in relating music to dreams, fantasies, feelings, and desires, especially those of a counterfactual and universal nature. (Note: As Ernst continues, in fuller context: "Otherwise we would no longer have any longing, and that would be the end of us. It is a reality that one feels with sensuous certainty in one's brain and heart, eyes and ears, nose and tongue, hands and hair roots, blood and all the nerves and muscles of the body! ... An artist is a person who has heightened senses. ... And they see in words and sounds ... a happier world. And their eye can open a hundred thousand eyes ..." ("Dann hättet ihr keine Sehnsucht mehr, und das wäre das Ende der Menschheit. Aber doch ist es eine Wirklichkeit, die ihr im Hirn und im Herzen, in Augen und Ohren, in Nase und Zunge, in Händen und Haarwurzeln, in Blut und allen Nerven und Muskeln eures Leibes mit sinnlicher Gewißheit fühlt! ... Ein Künstler ist ein Mensch, der selige Sinne hat. ... Und sie sehen in Worten und Tönen ... einer beglückteren Welt. Und sein Auge vermag hunderttausend Augen aufzutun ...").) Such themes predominate in Berg's often quasi-autobiographical and programmatic œuvre, not only romantically (Note: Alwa, a semi-autobiographical role in Lulu, is defined above all by his infatuated idealization of Lulu, just as the Lyric Suite is defined by Berg's infatuation with the idea of Hanna Fuchs-Robettin; but unlike Berg, who did not consummate his affair with Hanna, Alwa "is unable to sublimate his sinful passion" for his muse. On at least one occasion (likely spring 1907), echoing a passage from Frank Wedekind's Erdgeist, which he had seen in Vienna, Berg wrote to his wife Helene: "Again and again I kiss that hand of yours, my most glorious Symphony in D minor"; likewise Alwa sings, in a prominent episode full of kisses, a fanatical hymn comparing Lulu's features to music, with Wedekind's text modified to correspond roughly to music from the Lyric Suite (e.g., "these knees: a misterioso").) as in his Lyric Suite, but also socially as in Lulu, politically as in Wozzeck, (Note: At the very beginning as he shaves his Hauptmann, Wozzeck sings, "Poor folks like us! ... Money! If one has none! ... if I were a gentleman ... I'd be virtuous ... it must be a fine thing to be ... But ... our kind is unlucky in this world and in the next". Like Wozzeck, Berg was a soldier and saw in him "a bit of me ... since I have been spending these war years just as dependent on people I hate, have been in chains, sick, captive, resigned, in fact humiliated" (letter to Helene, 7 August 1918).) and even mortally as in his Violin Concerto. By contrast, Webern, who also started studying with Schoenberg in 1904, took from an evening with Mahler in 1905 that: "Nature is for us the model ...."

Berg was born in Vienna, the third of four children of Johanna and Konrad Berg. His father ran a successful export business, and the family owned several estates in Vienna and the countryside. The family's financial situation turned to the worse after the death of Konrad Berg in 1900, and it particularly affected young Berg, who had to repeat both his sixth and seventh grade to pass the exams. One of his closest lifelong friends and earliest biographer (under the pseudonym Hermann Herrenried), architect Hermann Watznauer, became a father figure (partly at Konrad's request), being ten years Berg's senior. Berg wrote him letters as long as thirty pages, often in florid, dramatic prose with idiosyncratic punctuation. (Note: These were habits that Berg sought to moderate in time, not only with maturity, but also especially under the increasing influence of Schoenberg.) Berg was more interested in literature than music as a child and would consider a career as a writer several times, turning to music slowly and at times unconfidently (Note: The duress of Schoenberg's criticisms provoked crises of confidence.) until the success of Wozzeck. He did not begin to compose until he was fifteen, when he started to teach himself music, although he did take piano lessons from his sister's governess. With Marie Scheuchl, a maid in the family estate of Berghof in Carinthia and fifteen years his senior, he fathered a daughter, Albine, born 4 December 1902.

In 1906 Berg met the singer Helene Nahowski (1885–1976), daughter of a wealthy family (rumoured to be in fact the illegitimate daughter of Emperor Franz Joseph I from his liaison with Anna Nahowski). Despite the outward hostility of her family, the couple married on 3 May 1911, although "her father insisted on a Protestant ceremony to facilitate the divorce he foresaw as inevitable."

=== Early works (1907–1914) ===
With little prior music education, Berg began studying counterpoint, music theory, and harmony under Arnold Schoenberg in October 1904. By 1906 he was studying music full-time; by 1907 he began composition lessons. His student compositions included five drafts for piano sonatas. He also wrote songs, including his Seven Early Songs (Sieben frühe Lieder), three of which were Berg's first publicly performed work in a concert that featured the music of Schoenberg's pupils in Vienna that year.

The early sketches eventually culminated in the Piano Sonata, Op. 1, published in 1910 and likely composed 1908–1909; it has been described as one of the most formidable "first" works ever written. Berg studied with Schoenberg for six years until 1911. Among Schoenberg's teachings was the idea that the unity of a musical composition depends upon all its aspects being derived from a single basic idea; this idea was later known as developing variation. Berg passed this on to his students, one of whom, Theodor W. Adorno, stated: "The main principle he conveyed was that of variation: everything was supposed to develop out of something else and yet be intrinsically different". The Piano Sonata is an example—the whole composition is derived from the work's opening quartal gesture and its opening phrase.

Berg was a part of Vienna's cultural elite during the heady fin de siècle period. His circle included the musicians Alexander von Zemlinsky and Franz Schreker, the painter Gustav Klimt, the writer and satirist Karl Kraus, the architect Adolf Loos, and the poet Peter Altenberg.

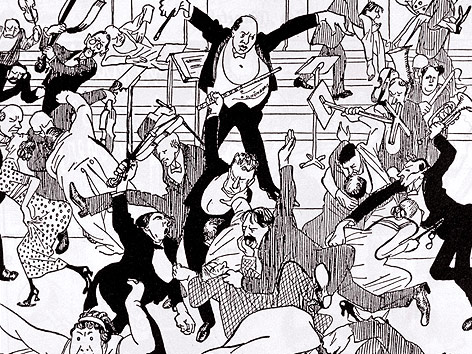
Watschenkonzert [slapping concert], caricature in Die Zeit (Vienna), 6 April 1913

In 1913 two of Berg's Altenberg Lieder (1912) premiered in Vienna, conducted by Schoenberg in the infamous Skandalkonzert. Settings of aphoristic poetic utterances, the songs are accompanied by a very large orchestra. The performance caused a riot, and had to be halted. Berg effectively withdrew the work, and it was not performed in full until 1952. The full score remained unpublished until 1966.

Berg had a particular interest in the number 23, using it to structure several works. Various suggestions have been made as to the reason for this interest: that he took it from the biorhythms theory of Wilhelm Fliess, in which a 23-day cycle is considered significant, or because he first suffered an asthma attack on the 23rd of the month.

=== Wozzeck (1914–1922) and Lulu (from 1928) ===
From 1915 to 1918 Berg served in the Austro-Hungarian Army. During a period of leave in 1917 he accelerated work on his first opera, Wozzeck. After the end of World War I, he settled again in Vienna, where he taught private pupils. He also helped Schoenberg run his Society for Private Musical Performances, which sought to create the ideal environment for the exploration and appreciation of unfamiliar new music by means of open rehearsals, repeat performances, and the exclusion of professional critics.

In 1924 three excerpts from Wozzeck were performed, which brought Berg his first public success. The opera, which Berg completed in 1922, was first performed on 14 December 1925, when Erich Kleiber conducted the first performance in Berlin. Today, Wozzeck is seen as one of the century's most important works. Berg made a start on his second opera, the three-act Lulu, in 1928 but interrupted the work in 1929 for the concert aria Der Wein which he completed that summer. Der Wein presaged Lulu in a number of ways, including vocal style, orchestration, design and text.

Other well-known Berg compositions include the Lyric Suite (1926), which was later shown to employ elaborate cyphers to document a secret love affair; the post-Mahlerian Three Pieces for Orchestra (completed in 1915 but not performed until after Wozzeck); and the Chamber Concerto (Kammerkonzert, 1923–25) for violin, piano, and 13 wind instruments: this latter is written so conscientiously that Pierre Boulez has called it "Berg's strictest composition" and it, too, is permeated by cyphers and posthumously disclosed hidden programs. It was at this time he began exhibiting tone clusters in his works after meeting with American avant-garde composer Henry Cowell, with whom he would eventually form a lifelong friendship.

=== Final years (1930–1935) ===
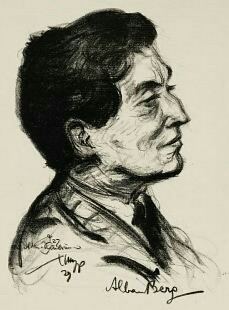
Sketch of Berg by Emil Stumpp

Life for the musical world was becoming increasingly difficult in the 1930s both in Vienna and Germany due to the rising tide of antisemitism and the Nazi cultural ideology that denounced modernity. Even to have an association with someone who was Jewish could lead to denunciation, and Berg's "crime" was to have studied with the Jewish composer Arnold Schoenberg. Berg found that opportunities for his work to be performed in Germany were becoming rare, and eventually his music was proscribed and placed on the list of degenerate music.

In 1932 Berg and his wife acquired an isolated lodge, the Waldhaus on the southern shore of the Wörthersee, near Schiefling am See in Carinthia, where he was able to work in seclusion, mainly on Lulu and the Violin Concerto. At the end of 1934, Berg became involved in the political intrigues around finding a replacement for Clemens Krauss as director of the Vienna State Opera.

As more of the performances of his work in Germany were cancelled by the Nazis, who had come to power in early 1933, he needed to ensure the new director would be an advocate for modernist music. Originally, the premiere of Lulu had been planned for the Berlin State Opera, where Erich Kleiber continued to champion his music and had conducted the premiere of Wozzeck in 1925, but now this was looking increasingly uncertain, and Lulu was rejected by the Berlin authorities in the spring of 1934. Kleiber's production of the Lulu symphonic suite on 30 November 1934 in Berlin was also the occasion of his resignation in protest at the extent of conflation of culture with politics. Even in Vienna, the opportunities for the Vienna School of musicians were dwindling.

Berg had interrupted the orchestration of Lulu because of an unexpected (and financially much-needed) commission from the Russian-American violinist Louis Krasner for a Violin Concerto (1935). This profoundly elegiac work, composed at unaccustomed speed and posthumously premiered, has become one of Berg's frequently performed compositions. Like much of his mature work, it employs an idiosyncratic adaptation of Schoenberg's "dodecaphonic" or twelve-tone technique, that enables the composer to produce passages openly evoking tonality, including quotations from historical tonal music, such as a Bach chorale and a Carinthian folk song. The Violin Concerto was dedicated "to the memory of an Angel", Manon Gropius, the deceased daughter of architect Walter Gropius and Alma Mahler.

=== Death ===
Berg died aged 50 in Vienna, on Christmas Eve 1935, from blood poisoning apparently caused by a furuncle on his back, induced by an insect sting that occurred in November. He was buried at the Hietzing Cemetery in Vienna.

Before he died, Berg had completed the orchestration of only the first two of the three acts of Lulu. The completed acts were successfully premièred in Zürich in 1937. For personal reasons Helene Berg subsequently imposed a ban on any attempt to "complete" the final act, which Berg had in fact completed in short score. An orchestration was therefore commissioned in secret from Friedrich Cerha and premièred in Paris (under Pierre Boulez) only in 1979, soon after Helene Berg's own death.

== Legacy ==
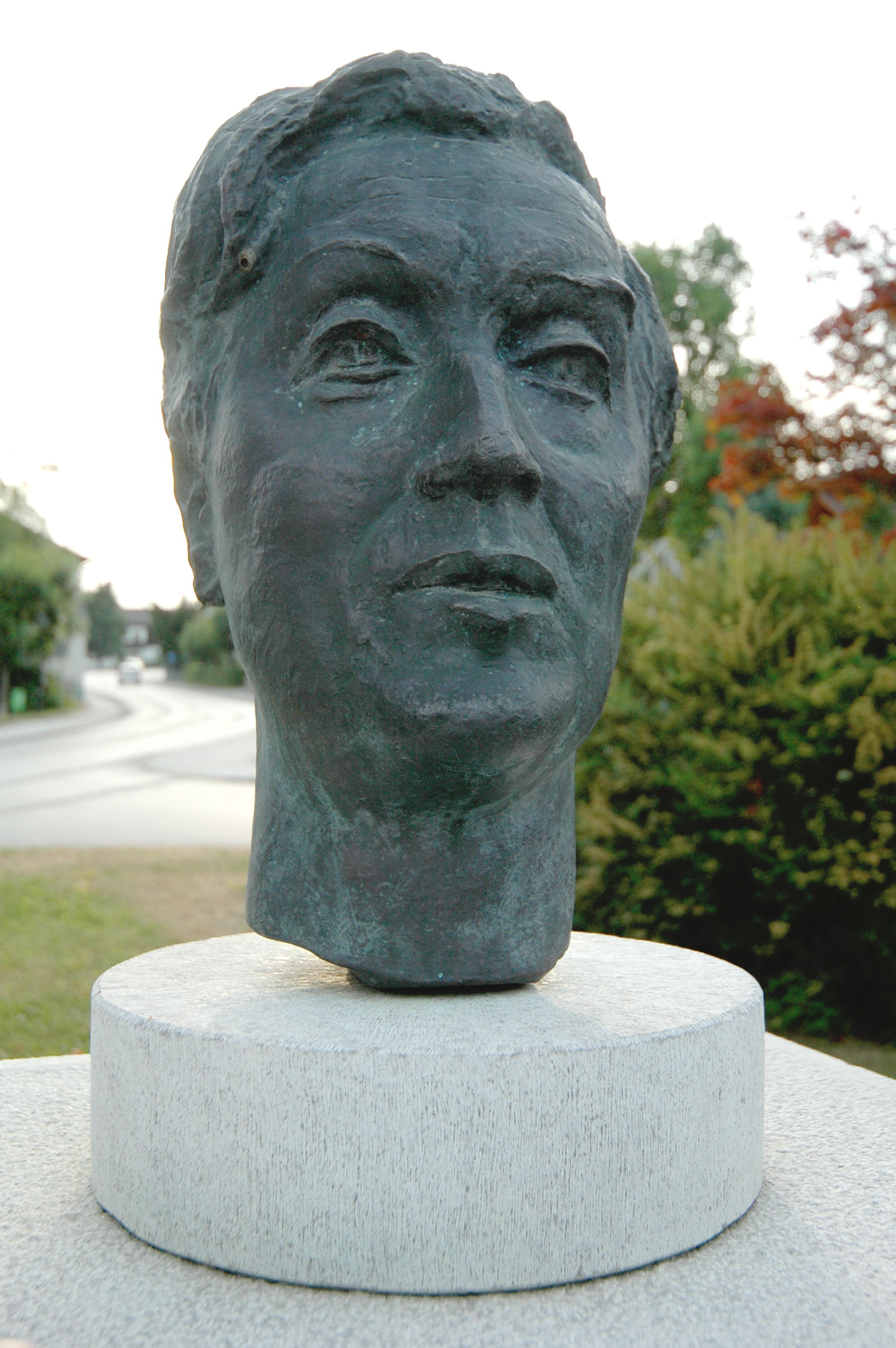
Bust of Berg at Schiefling am See, Carinthia, Austria

Berg is remembered as one of the most important composers of the 20th century and the most widely performed opera composer among the Second Viennese School. He is said to have brought more "human values" to the twelve-tone system, his works seen as more "emotional" than Schoenberg's. Critically, he is seen as having preserved the Viennese tradition in his music.

Berg scholar Douglas Jarman writes in The New Grove Dictionary of Music and Musicians that "[as] the 20th century closed, the 'backward-looking' Berg suddenly came as [George] Perle remarked, to look like its most forward-looking composer."

The Alban Berg Foundation, founded by the composer's widow in 1969, cultivates the memory and works of the composer, and awards scholarships. The Alban Berg Monument, situated next to the Vienna State Opera and unveiled in 2016, was funded by the Foundation.

The Alban Berg Quartett was a string quartet named after him, active from 1971 until 2008.

The asteroid 4528 Berg is named after him (1983).

== Major compositions ==
Piano

Piano Sonata, Op. 1

Chamber

String Quartet, Op. 3
Lyric Suite, string quartet
Chamber Concerto (1925) for piano, violin and 13 wind instruments

Orchestral

Three Pieces for Orchestra, Op. 6
Violin Concerto

Vocal

Seven Early Songs
Vier Lieder (Four Songs), Op. 2
Five Orchestral Songs on Postcard Texts of Peter Altenberg, Op. 4
Der Wein
Schließe mir die Augen beide

Operas

Wozzeck, Op. 7 (1925)
Lulu (1937)

== See also ==
- List of Austrians in music

== Notes and references ==
=== Sources ===
- Adorno, Theodor W.; Berg, Alban (2005) [1997]. Lonitz, Henri (ed.). Briefwechsel 1925–1935 [Correspondence 1925–1935]. Hoban, Wieland – translator, originally published by Suhrkamp Verlag, Frankfurt. Cambridge: Polity. ISBN 978-0-7456-9496-2. Archived from the original on 29 April 2020.
- Antokoletz, Elliott (2014). A History of Twentieth-Century Music in a Theoretic-Analytical Context. Hoboken: Taylor & Francis. ISBN 978-1-135-03730-7. Archived from the original on 29 April 2020.
- Baron, John H. (2010). Chamber Music: A Research and Information Guide. Routledge. pp. 301ff. ISBN 978-1-135-84828-6. Archived from the original on 16 February 2017.
- Breivik, Magnar. 1998. "The Representation of Sleep and Death in Berg's Piano Songs, op.2". In Encrypted Messages in Alban Berg’s Music, ed. Siglind Bruhn, 109–136. Border Crossings Series. London: Taylor & Francis. ISBN 978-1-136-52287-1.
- Bruhn, Siglind. 1998. "Editor's Introduction". In Encrypted Messages in Alban Berg’s Music, ed. Siglind Bruhn, xv–xvi. Border Crossings Series. London: Taylor & Francis. ISBN 978-1-136-52287-1.
- Ewen, David (1952). The Complete Book of 20th Century Music (revised ed.). Prentice-Hall. Archived from the original on 25 July 2020.
- Hailey, Christopher, ed. (2010). Alban Berg and His World. Princeton, New Jersey: Princeton University Press. ISBN 978-1-4008-3647-5. Archived from the original on 29 April 2020.
- Hailey, Christopher (2010a). "Berg's Worlds". In Hailey (2010), pp. 3–32.
- Headlam, Dave (2013). "Berg, Alban 1885–1935". In Steib, Murray (ed.). Reader's Guide to Music: History, Theory and Criticism. Routledge. p. 78ff. ISBN 978-1-135-94262-5. Archived from the original on 25 July 2020.
- Jarman, Douglas (April 1983). "Alban Berg, Wilhelm Fliess and the Secret Programme of the Violin Concerto". The Musical Times. 124 (1682): 218–223. doi:10.2307/962034. JSTOR 962034.
- Jarman, Douglas (1985) [1979]. The Music of Alban Berg (Revised ed.). Berkeley: University of California Press. ISBN 978-0-520-04954-3. Archived from the original on 29 April 2020.
- Jarman, Douglas (1990). The Berg Companion. Boston: Northeastern University Press. ISBN 978-1-55553-068-6. OCLC 19739582.
- Jarman, Douglas (1991). Alban Berg: Lulu. Cambridge: Cambridge University Press. ISBN 978-0-521-28480-6. Archived from the original on 29 April 2020.
- Jarman, Douglas (2001). "Berg, Alban (Maria Johannes)". Grove Music Online (8th ed.). Oxford University Press. doi:10.1093/gmo/9781561592630.article.02767. ISBN 978-1-56159-263-0. (subscription, Wikilibrary access, or UK public library membership required)
- Johnson, Julian. 1999. Webern and the Transformation of Nature. Cambridge: Cambridge University Press. ISBN 978-0-521-66149-2.
- Johnson, Julius. 2006. "Anton Webern, the Social Democratic Kunstelle and Musical Modernism." Austrian Studies 14(1):197–213.
- Lauder, Robert Neil (1986). Two Early Piano Works of Alban Berg: A Stylistic and Structural Analysis (thesis). Chapel Hill: University of North Carolina.
- Monson, Karen. 1979. Alban Berg: A Biography. Reprinted, London: Macdonald and Jane's. 1980. ISBN 978-0-354-04464-6.
- Notley, Margaret. "1934, Alban Berg, and the shadow of politics: documents of a troubled year". In Hailey (2010), pp. 223–268.
- Perle, George. 1980. The Operas of Alban Berg, Vol. I: Wozzeck. Berkeley: University of California Press. ISBN 978-0-520-06617-5.
- Perle, George. 1985. The Operas of Alban Berg, Vol. II: Lulu. Berkeley: University of California Press. ISBN 978-0-520-06616-8.
- Pople, Anthony (1991). Berg: Violin Concerto. Cambridge: Cambridge University Press. p. 28. ISBN 978-0-521-39976-0. OCLC 22314162.
- Pople, Anthony (1997). The Cambridge Companion To Berg. Cambridge: Cambridge University Press. OL 1000795M.
- Taruskin, Richard (2010). Music in the Early Twentieth Century. New York: Oxford University Press. p. 196. ISBN 978-0-19-538484-0. OCLC 261177783.
