= Emil Stumpp =

German painter and teacher (1886–1941)

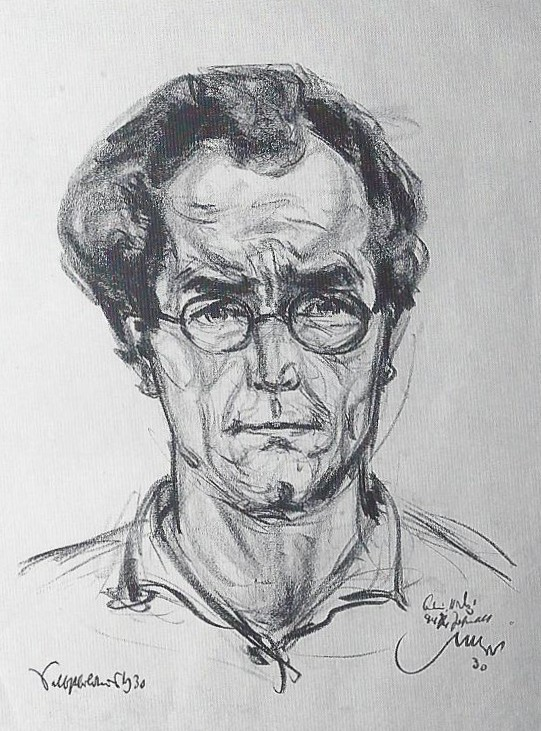
Self-portrait of Emil Stumpp

Emil Stumpp (17 March 1886 – 5 April 1941) was a German painter, teacher, and artist known for his cartoons and drawings of well-known people in the 1930s during the Weimar Republic. He died in 1941 in jail after returning to Germany. He had left after drawing an unflattering portrait of Adolf Hitler.

== Biography ==
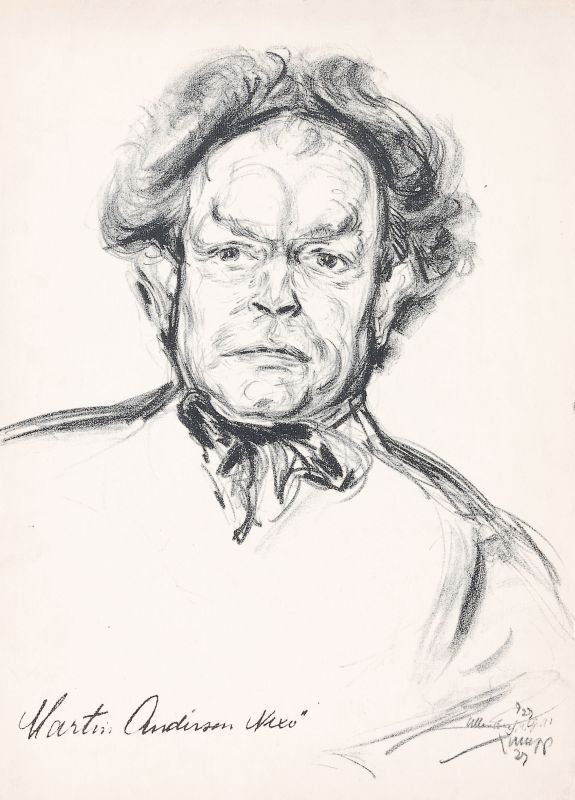
A portrait by Stumpp of Martin Andersen Nexø

Stumpp was born in Neckarzimmern in southwestern Germany, but he moved with his family at the age of three to Worms. When he was eight the family moved to Karlsruhe. Stumpp served in the first world war reaching the rank of lieutenant. His early education had been in Karlsruhe, Uppsala and in Berlin. He studied art as well as philosophy, history and German. In 1924 he left his teaching post to become a full-time artist, despite having a wife and five children to support.

He was successful and created portraits of many well known people including Bertold Brecht, Käthe Kollwitz, Erich Mendelsohn, Chancellor Friedrich Ebert, Alfons Paquet, Thomas Mann, Otto Braun and Else Lasker-Schüler, Le Corbusier.

He was eventually commissioned to create a portrait of Adolf Hitler for his birthday in 1933. The work was not well received and the portrait, Stumpp, his paper (the General Anzeiger), and its editor were all prohibited.

Stumpp left the country but returned in 1940 to tend to his terminally ill daughter. He rented an estate in Perwelke, East Prussia, and continued to be critical of the Nazi government. Denounced by his landlords, he was arrested and sentenced to one year in jail. Weakened by malnutrition and mistreatment, he died of pneumonia in Stuhm prison in West Prussia in 1941.

== Legacy ==
Stumpp was given an exhibition in Dortmund in 1996 at the Institut für Zeitungsforschung der Stadt. He left about 6,000 drawings which were all drawn from life.

== Sources ==
- "Stumpp, Emil". Benezit Dictionary of Artists. 2011.
