= Piano Sonata (Dukas) =

Musical work composed by Paul Dukas

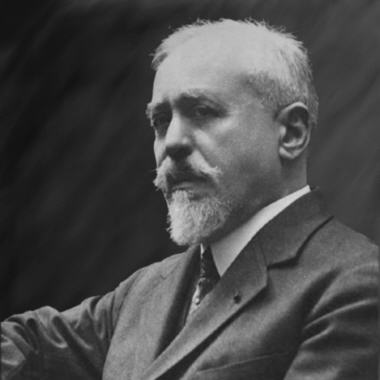
Paul Dukas

The Piano Sonata in E♭ minor is a musical work composed by Paul Dukas between 1899 and 1900, and published in 1901. The piano sonata has four movements:

1. Modérément vif (expressif et marqué) (E♭ minor)
2. Calme – un peu lent – très soutenu (A♭ major)
3. Vivement – avec légèreté (B minor)
4. Très lent (E♭ minor → E♭ major)

== Reception ==
In the first decade of the 20th century, following the immense success of his orchestral work The Sorcerer's Apprentice, Dukas completed two complex and technically demanding large-scale works for solo piano: the Piano Sonata, dedicated to Saint-Saëns, and Variations, Interlude and Finale on a Theme by Rameau (1902). In Dukas's piano works critics have discerned the influence of Beethoven, or, "Beethoven as he was interpreted to the French mind by César Franck". Both works were premiered by Édouard Risler, a celebrated pianist of the era.

In an analysis of the work in The Musical Quarterly in 1928, the critic Irving Schwerké wrote:

The Sonata is classical in structure and in four movements, connected more by mutual formal perfection and nobility of thought than by cyclic procedures. The first movement … is built on two sharply contrasted themes, developed according to the sonata-form. The Andante is in the direct line of the great slow movements of Beethoven, and a supreme example of the grandeur attainable by modern technic [sic] working in this inspired form. The agitated Scherzo, with its unexpected fugal conclusion, is followed by the heroic Finale, comparable in breadth and majesty to the Stairway of Honour of the Palace of Versailles. By the vastness of its proportions, the quality of its writing, the power of its developments, and by its luminous lyricism, the Sonata in E flat minor is unrivalled by any other composition of this type. It transcends the piano, the factor that has retarded comprehension of it being its own magnitude.

The Sonata, described by the critic Edward Lockspeiser as "huge and somewhat recondite", did not enter the mainstream repertoire, but it has more recently been championed by such pianists as John Ogdon, Marc-André Hamelin, Vincenzo Maltempo and Margaret Fingerhut.

== Sources ==
- Lockspeiser, Edward (1957). "Paul Dukas". In Bacharach, A. L. (ed.). The Music Masters. Pelican Books. OCLC 655768838.
- Nicholas, Jeremy (July 2006). "Dukas". Gramophone. p. 74.
- Schwerké, Irving (July 1928). "Paul Dukas: a Brief Appreciation". The Musical Quarterly. Volume XIV.
