= Claudius von Wrochem =

German cellist

Claudius von Wrochem (born 24 April 1965) is a German cellist.

== Life ==
Born in Berlin, Wrochem studied cello with Peter Mann in Berlin from 1978 to 1984 and with George Neikrug in Boston from 1987 to 1990. He attended masterclasses with George Neikrug, Uzi Wiesel and Werner Thomas. From 2000 to 2009, he took singing lessons with Juliane Gabriel in Berlin.

He is particularly interested in chamber music and contemporary music. He played in the "Duo von Wrochem" with his father, the pianist Johann Gottlob von Wrochem, from 1983 to 2006. He devoted himself to Neue Musik as a member of the ensembles work in progress - Berlin (1991-1998) and UnitedBerlin (1995-1998). Together with his wife, the musicologist and violist Simone Heilgendorff, he founded the Kairos Quartet in 1996, specialising in music after 1950.) Since 1993, he has been engaged in the performance practice of baroque and classical music, mostly in changing instrumentations; he uses a cello by J. G. Thumhart, 1780, for this purpose.

As improviser he works both freely and in terms of concept improvisations, often in the context of silent films, readings, exhibitions or in educational contexts.

In the function of artistic director, he led the start-up phase of the IZZM (International Centre of Contemporary Music) in Carinthia/Austria in 2009/10.

== Repertoire ==
In addition to the standard repertoire for cello and piano and some recent duo works such as Morton Feldman's Untitled Composition/Patterns in a Chromatic Field, Wrochem played the Bach Suites I-V, a Reger suite and solo works by Bloch, Hindemith, Ligeti and many other contemporary composers. His extensive repertoire of string quartets can be found on the homepage of the Kairos Quartet. Of the more than 120 premieres in which he has been involved, more than half are with the Kairos Quartet, the others with Neue Musik ensembles, duos and solo works.

== Teaching activity ==
Since 2013 instrumental teaching in collaboration with Berlin schools using the ColorStrings methods and the principles of Demetrius Constantine Dounis and George Neikrug.

In 2010-12, Wrochem was a lecturer in Neue Musik and its mediation in ensemble practice and conceptual improvisation at the Alpen-Adria-Universität Klagenfurt.

He gave workshops and masterclasses at various universities in Austria and abroad (including Poland, USA, Mexico, Switzerland, Austria, Germany), at the Mozarteum Salzburg and at the conservatories of Shanghai and Guangzhou on notation issues and string quartet composition.

Since 2010 he has been conducting NM mediation workshops at secondary schools, often in Carinthia and sponsored by KulturKontakt Austria.

He also participates to various jury such as the Jugend musiziert (1996), John Cage Prize for the Interpretation of New Music, Zeitklang 2011 - Intern. Kompositionswettbewerb f. SQ.

From 1992 to 2008, he was activ as cello teacher at Berlin music schools, also in study preparation (StuVo), 2020 substituting at the Potsdam Mittelmark music school "Engelbert Humperdinck".

== Recordings, productions ==
- 2018: Gans Nackt. (Vimeo)
- 2015: Marina Khorkova 'Klangnarbe' among others. String Quartet [2010] (WERGO)
- 2013: mientras A. Schönberg Zweites Streichquartett, Sabine Panzer mientras für Streichquartett und Sopran (Kairos Quartett and Angelika Luz)
- 2012: Stepha Schweiger visionmusique (among others live recording of the premiere of Skira for flutes, accordion and cello, 1997) little salt 12012
- 2012: Knut Müller Porträt Thorn, Zeug (Streichquartette) Edition Zeitklang/Deutschlandradio
- 2009: Jay Schwartz Porträt (Music for five stringed instruments) (WERGO/Deutscher Musikrat/DeutschlandRadio)
- 2008: Helmut Zapf Das Goldene Kalb Ballet for solo trumpet, voice and ensemble (Ensemble Mosaik)
- 2008: Thomas Hummel Aus Trachila. A hyper-realistic recording – for speaker and ensemble (Neos 10804)
- 2007: Wider den Strich – Musik in Deutschland: Orm Finnendahl Fälschung (BMG)
- 2005: Enno Poppe Portrait (Tier for string quartet) col legno/DeutschlandRadio
- 2004: Interpretenporträt Kairos Quartett: Georg Friedrich Haas (string quartets No. 1+2) Edition Zeitklang/DeutschlandRadio
- 2001: Interpretenporträt Kairos Quartett with György Kurtág op. 1, Julio Estrada Canto mnémico, Knut Müller Thorn, Luciano Berio Sincronie (CD-Ersteinspielung) Edition Zeitklang/DeutschlandRadio
- 2000: Ensemble UnitedBerlin: Conrado del Rosario Twines, Helmut Zapf Abendklänge Edel Records
- 1999: Viera Janárčeková Portrait (string quartet No. 5) Domowina-Verlag/Hessische Rundfunk
- 1997: Luigi Nono Canti per 13 with the Ensemble UnitedBerlin (WERGO 6631-2)
- 1997: Neue Musik in Rheinsberg Matthias Jann mouvement de silence (NCA/MA 9809838) (UnitedBerlin)
- 1996: Juro Mětšk Portrait Canti per cello e piano, Syndrom, Kontraktion (Domovina-Verlag/Kreuzberg Records) (UnitedBerlin)
- 1996: Samples recorded for "Das virtuelle Orchester", a New Musik sound database
- since 1996 numerous concert recordings: BBC London, various ORF studios, RAI (Italy), Danske Radio, Deutsches Radio Schweiz, Slovenian Radio, almost all German public broadcasters.
- 1995: New Saxophone Chamber Music Kyburz Cells (col legno) (UnitedBerlin)
- since 1990, studio work for theatre music, radio plays, tapes or sound installations.
