= La Péri =

La Péri is the title of two ballets:

- La Péri (Burgmüller), by Friedrich Burgmüller, Jean Coralli, and Théophile Gautier, first performed in 1843
- La Péri (Dukas), by Paul Dukas and Ivan Clustine, first performed in 1912
