= Variations, Interlude and Finale on a Theme by Rameau =

Composition by Paul Dukas

The Variations, Interlude and Finale on a Theme by Rameau (French: Variations, interlude et finale sur un thème de Rameau) were composed by Paul Dukas between 1899 and 1902. The work was first performed in Paris in 1903.

== Structure ==
Menuet (Note: Le Lardon from the Pièces de Clavecin composed by Jean-Philippe Rameau.) [Theme]
Variation I. Tendrement
Variation II. Assez vif, très rythmé
Variation III. Sans hâte, délicatement
Variation IV. Un peu animé, avec légèreté
Variation V. Lent
Variation VI. Modéré
Variation VII. Assez vif
Variation VIII. Très modéré
Variation IX. Animé
Variation X. Sans lenteur, bien marqué
Variation XI. Sombre, assez lent
Interlude
Finale (Variation XII). Modérément animé – Vif

== Reception ==
In an analysis of the work in The Musical Quarterly in 1928, the critic Irving Schwerké wrote:

Variations on a Theme by Rameau … was performed for the first time, by Édouard Risler, at the Société Nationale, March 23, 1903. The variations, eleven in number, exhale a classical and yet intrepidly free spirit. Sometimes the composer utilizes the merest portion of the theme, again he fits entirely new material into the thematic pattern. Each variation reveals Paul Dukas' mastery of traditional forms, his virtuosity as a writer, and the poetic quality of his sensibility.

In the first decade of the 20th century, following the immense success of his orchestral work The Sorcerer's Apprentice, Dukas completed two complex and technically demanding large-scale works for solo piano: the Piano Sonata, dedicated to Camille Saint-Saëns, and the Variations, Interlude and Finale on a Theme by Rameau (1902). In Dukas's piano works critics have discerned the influence of Beethoven, or, "Beethoven as he was interpreted to the French mind by César Franck". Lockspeiser describes the Variations as "more developed and assured" than the Sonata: "Dukas infuses the conventional form with a new and powerful spirit." Both works were premiered by Édouard Risler, a celebrated pianist of the era.

== See also ==
- List of variations on a theme by another composer

== Sources ==
- Lockspeiser, Edward (1957). "Paul Dukas". In Bacharach, A. L. (ed.). The Music Masters. Pelican Books. OCLC 655768838.
- Schwerké, Irving (July 1928). "Paul Dukas: a Brief Appreciation". The Musical Quarterly. Volume XIV.
- Groote, Inga Mai (2012). "Variation als Entwicklung. Dukas’ 'Variations, interlude et finale sur un thème de Rameau'". Musik-Konzepte vol. 156/157, p. 121–136.
