= Polyeucte =

1643 drama by French writer Pierre Corneille

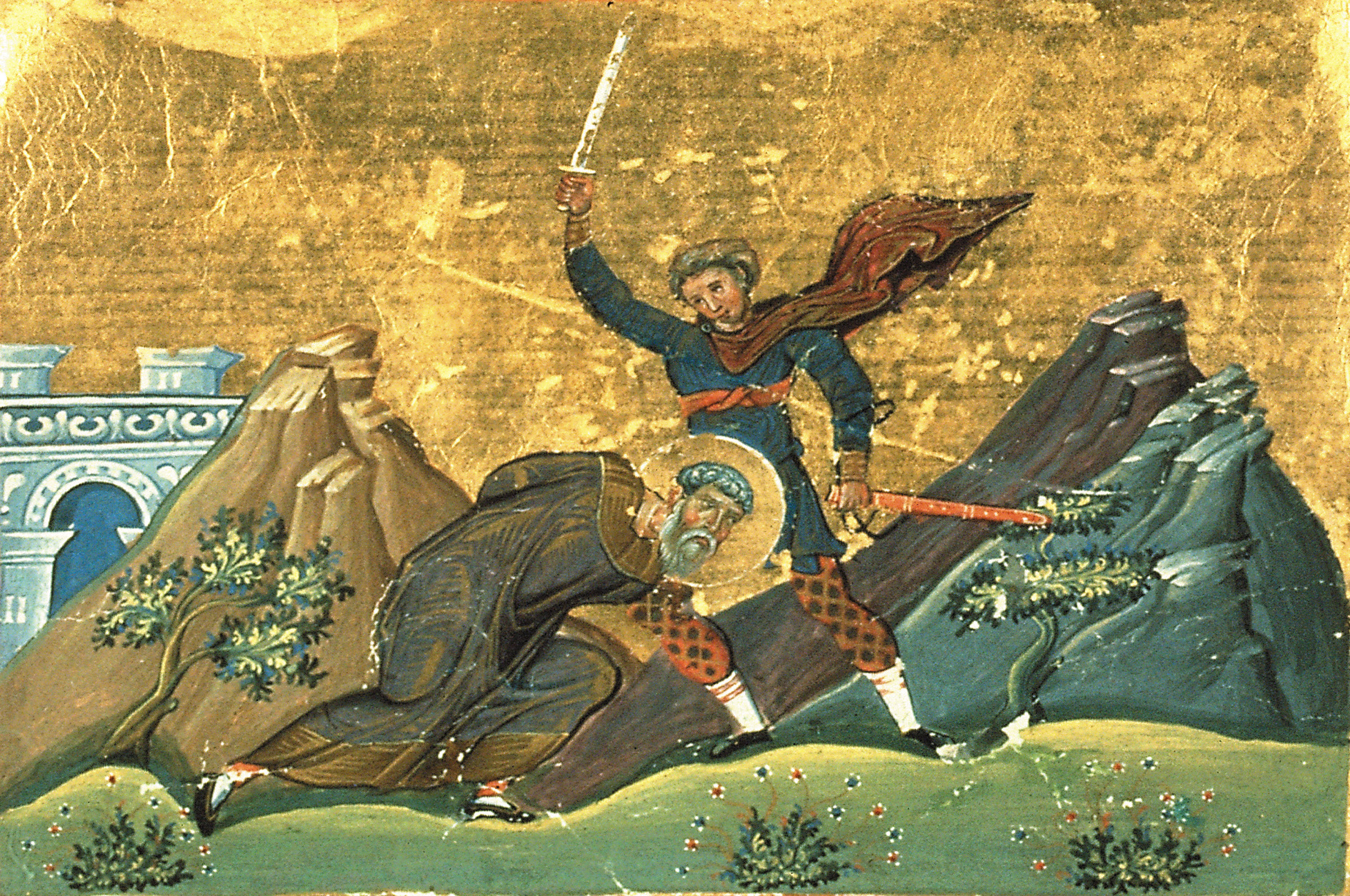
Painting depicting the martyrdom of Polyeuctus, from the Menologion of Basil II (c. 1000 AD)

Polyeucte is a drama in five acts by French writer Pierre Corneille. It was finished in December 1642 and debuted in October 1643. It is based on the life of the martyr Saint Polyeuctus (Polyeucte).

The drama is set in ancient Armenia (in a city, Melitene, which is in present-day Turkey) during a time when Christians were persecuted there under the Roman Empire. Polyeucte, an Armenian nobleman, converts to Christianity to the great despair of his wife, Pauline, and of his father-in-law, Felix. Despite them, Polyeucte becomes a martyr, causing Pauline and Felix to finally convert as well. There is also a romantic subplot: the Roman Severus is in love with Pauline and hopes she will be his after the conversion of Polyeucte. However, she chooses to stay at the side of her husband. Before dying, Polyeucte entrusts Severus with Pauline.

Polyeucte is one of the last 17th-century French dramas with a religious subject—Corneille did also write Théodore in 1645 and Racine wrote Esther (1689) and Athalie (1691), but these were not meant for public performance. Later playwrights were not as willing to mix religious and worldly themes.

In 1906, one act of the opera was performed under the auspices of the Carthage Institute in the ancient Roman theatre at Carthage, Tunisia, making it the first modern performance to have taken place in that historic space (which had functioned as an active theatre from ca. AD 150 to AD 439 and was only unearthed in 1904).

== Adaptations ==
In 1878, Polyeucte was adapted into an opera by Charles Gounod, with the assistance of the librettist Jules Barbier. The opera was not a success and is rarely performed except for a number of arias including "Source délicieuse" and the barcarolle "Nymphes attentives". Other works based on the play include a ballet by Marc-Antoine Charpentier (1679), the opera Poliuto (1838) by Donizetti (adapted into French by Scribe as Les martyrs), an overture by Paul Dukas (1891) and a composition by Edgar Tinel.
