= Simone Heilgendorff =

German violist and musicologist

Simone Heilgendorff (born 1961 in Opladen) is a German musicologist, violist as well as dramaturge and curator.

== Life ==
Heilgendorff studied musicology, philosophy and psychology (Dr. phil. 1999, at the Humboldt-Universität zu Berlin) and viola (Master of Music 1991, University of Michigan) in Freiburg im Breisgau, Zurich, and in Berlin. In June 2019, she was habilitated in musicology at the University of Salzburg. Since 1993, she has held positions at colleges and universities, including a university professorship in applied musicology at the University of Klagenfurt from 2007 to 2013. From 2013 to 2016, she was head of the international research project "New Music Festivals as Agorai – Their Formation and Impact on Warsaw Autumn, Festival d'automne à Paris, and Wien Modern after 1980", funded by the Austrian Science Fund (University of Salzburg). From autumn 2014 to autumn 2019, she was head of the programme area "ConTempOhr. Mediation of Contemporary Music" at the Focus on Science and Art of the University of Salzburg and the Mozarteum University Salzburg.

Heilgendorff teaches at the University of Salzburg (Department of Music and Dance Studies) and the Universität der Künste Berlin (Sound Studies and Sound Art).

Heilgendorff is a violist and, together with her husband the cellist Claudius von Wrochem, she is a founding member and co-managing director of the Kairos Quartet, which specialises in contemporary (art) music and gives concerts and promotes contemporary music worldwide. As a musician, she is particularly interested in chamber music, the historically informed performance of baroque music and Neue Musik. She studied viola with Christoph Schiller, Enrique Santiago, Emil Cantor and Yizhak Schotten.

She has been active in the development and realisation of musical programmes since 1983, not only in the Kairos Quartett, but also as artistic director and curator, especially of the series of concerts and workshops of the Campus Musick association, which took place in Klagenfurt from 2007 to 2012 in connection with the university, and of the numerous events between music and science, for which she is co-responsible at the already mentioned ConTempOhr programme area in Salzburg in autumn 2014.

Her work focuses also on cultural and cultural-psychological contexts of music, on Americana around John Cage, on musical analysis as well as musical performance practice respectively. Increasingly, artistic-scientific research is also becoming relevant to her work.
