= La Péri (Burgmüller) =

1843 ballet by Friedrich Burgmüller

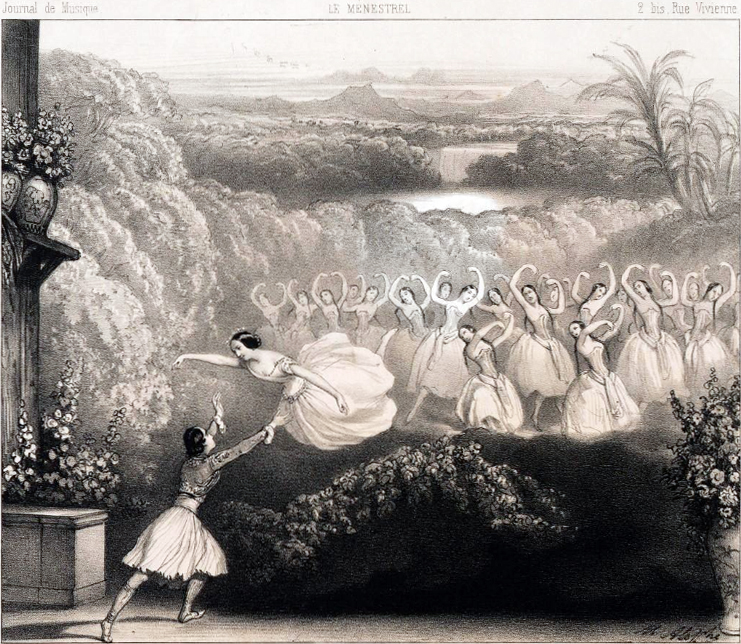
The "pas du songe" in La Péri

La Péri is a fantastic ballet choreographed by Jean Coralli (1779-1854) to music composed by Friedrich Burgmüller. With a scenario devised by Théophile Gautier and Coralli, scenery designed by Charles Séchan, Jules Diéterle, Édouard Desplechin, Humanité Philastre, and Charles Cambon, and costumes designed by Paul Lorimer and Hippolyte d'Orshwiller, it was first presented by the Paris Opera Ballet at the Académie Royale de Musique on 17 July 1843.

Vladimir Malakhov staged a production of the ballet for the Staatsballett Berlin in 2010.

== Scenario ==
The ballet, in two acts, three scenes, had a typically Romantic plot dealing with a mortal's love for a supernatural being. Gautier's scenario was inspired by his attraction to the Orient and was devised for his favorite ballerina, Carlotta Grisi, in the guise of a Persian fairy. She appears to the wealthy and world-weary Sultan Achmet, danced by Lucien Petipa, in one of his opium dreams, and he falls in love with her. To test his love, she takes the form of a runaway slave, Leila. Achmet is imprisoned for refusing to surrender her to her owner, but in an apotheosis the walls of his prison vanish and he is seen entering paradise with the Péri.

== Choreography ==
Coralli's choreography provided Grisi with two striking dances: a pas de songe that culminated in her daring leap from a six-foot-high platform into her partner's arms, and a pas d'abeille, a decorous striptease prompted by the invasion of an imaginary bee. The ballet's immediate success did much to revive Grisi's flagging reputation. It was soon produced on ballet stages in theaters all over Europe.

== Historical note ==
French composer Paul Dukas (1865-1935) wrote a "poème dansé" entitled La Péri in 1911 that was first choreographed by Ivan Clustine in 1912 and that has since been choreographed in many versions by other choreographers, including Frederick Ashton, Serge Lifar, and George Skibine. None of them has any connection to Coralli's ballet set to the Burgmüller score.

== See also ==
- La Péri (Dukas)
