= Margaret G. Cobb =

American musicologist and archivist (1907–2010)

Margaret Gallatin Cobb (16 September 1907 – 24 March 2010) was an American musicologist and archivist specializing in the life and music of Claude Debussy, having publishing several books and articles on the subject. She was the founder and first director of the Centre de documentation Claude Debussy and the journal Cahiers Debussy. In 2002 Cobb received the title Officier de l'Ordre des Arts et des Lettres from the French government for her contributions to the field of Debussy studies.

== Career ==
In 1972 Cobb accepted the position of Director of the Centre de documentation Claude Debussy in Saint-Germain-en-Laye, the composer’s birthplace. In this capacity, she established an archive of primary source materials related to the life and work of the composer which now is held by the Bibliothèque nationale de France. Her 2005 monograph, Debussy's Letters to Inghelbrecht: The Story of a Musical Friendship, provides a comprehensive overview of her efforts at the Centre which concluded in 1976.

Drawing on her time at the Centre, Cobb published The Poetic Debussy: A Collection of His Song Text and Selected Letters in 1982. In his foreword to the book, the French musicologist and librarian François Lesure evaluates Cobb's work thus:

Margaret G. Cobb, who organized the Centre de Documentation Claude Debussy and has previously published an extensive discography of Debussy’s music, approaches her editorial work as both a scholar and a humanist. While maintaining a very high level of accuracy, she never allows the appurtenances of scholarship to intrude upon the aesthetic enjoyment of the song texts and translations as poetry. Her commentary is always succinct, unobtrusive, and apposite.

In 2002 Cobb received the title of Officier de l’Ordre des Arts et des Lettres from the French government for her contributions to Debussy scholarship. In a 2004 collaboration with the New York Public Library, she provided a foreword on Debussy and the poet Théophile Gautier to theorist Marie Rolf's edition of the newly discovered song "Les papillons." The following year, Cobb published her final contribution to the field of Debussy's studies, the monograph Debussy's Letters to Inghelbrecht: The Story of a Musical Friendship, which focuses on the relationship between the composer and the conductor Désiré-Émile Inghelbrecht. In his review of the work in Notes, musicologist Simon Trezise writes:

The Debussy-Inghelbrecht letters belonged to Ingelbrecht’s widow, who gave them to Cobb late in her life, in recognition no doubt of her tireless efforts on behalf of both composer and conductor. Hence the present publication...Cobb’s biographies of the main players in the letters are invaluable, as are her annotations...It is gratifying to have another of Debussy’s closer professional and personal relationships opened up in such a handsomely produced and well-researched volume.

== Archival donations ==
Over the course of her career, Cobb donated a collection of manuscripts to the Morgan Library & Museum in New York City. These gifts include one hundred and forty-six letters in Debussy’s hand, seven autographed manuscript scores by Debussy (including his symphonic suite Printemps), first editions of Debussy’s Cinq poèmes de Baudelaire and La Mer, an alternate version of Debussy’s piano étude “Pour les arpèges composés,” as well as autograph letters by Voltaire, Albert Gallatin, Colette, Maurice Ravel, Emma-Claude Debussy and D.E. Inghelbrecht. In recognition of her service to the Morgan, the library placed a memorial notice in the New York Times to mark her death in 2010.

In addition to her donations to the Morgan, Cobb made archival contributions to Sibley Music Library in Rochester, NY. These include photocopies of correspondence between the French musicologist and Debussy biographer Marcel Dietschy and the English musicologist Edward Lockspeiser, as well as fifty-nine items of sheet music composed by Ida Clara Bostelmann (1894-1979).

== Selected bibliography ==
- Cobb, Margaret G. Discographie de l'oeuvre de Claude Debussy. Publications du Centre de documentation Claude Debussy. Geneva: Minkoff, 1975.
- Cobb, Margaret G. Foreword to "Les papillons" by Claude Debussy. Edited by Marie Rolf. New York: New York Public Library, 2004.
- Cobb, Margaret G., ed. The Poetic Debussy: A Collection of His Song Texts and Published Letters. Revised 2nd ed., Eastman Studies in Music. Rochester, NY: University of Rochester Press, 1994.
- Cobb, Margaret G., ed. Debussy's Letters to Inghelbrecht: The Story of a Musical Friendship. Translated by Richard Miller. Eastman Studies in Music. Rochester, NY: University of Rochester Press, 2005.
- Cobb, Margaret G. and Miller, Richard. "Claude Debussy to Claudius and Gustave Popelin: Nine Unpublished Letters." 19th-Century Music 13, no. 1 (1989): 139–48, https://doi.org/10.2307/746210.
- Dietschy, Marcel. A Portrait of Claude Debussy. Translated by William Ashbrook and Margaret G. Cobb. Oxford: Oxford University Press, 1990.
