= Symphony in C (Dukas) =

Symphony by Paul Dukas

Dukas in 1895

The Symphony in C is a symphony by the French composer Paul Dukas, dedicated to his fellow musician Paul Vidal. The symphony was written between 1894 and 1896 and was performed when the composer was aged 30 in the Concerts de l'Opéra on 3 January 1897, conducted by Vidal.

== Music ==
It is written for a standard orchestra comprising three flutes (the third doubling piccolo), two oboes (the first doubling cor anglais), two clarinets in B♭ and A, two bassoons, four French horns in F (third and fourth also in E), two trumpets in F, piccolo trumpet in D, three trombones, tuba, timpani, and strings.

Like César Franck's Symphony, Dukas' is in three movements rather than the conventional four:

1. Allegro non troppo vivace, ma con fuoco (C major, 6/8)
2. Andante espressivo e sostenuto (4/8, E minor, C major, B major, E minor)
3. Finale. Allegro spiritoso (C major, 3/4 = 9/8)

The first movement is a modified sonata form allegro with three themes. The second movement is also in sonata form, but only with two themes. The finale is an ABACA rondo.

Grove's Dictionary of Music and Musicians says of the Symphony that "passing references to influences (Franck, Chausson, d’Indy, Bizet, Lalo, Saint-Saëns, Beethoven or, in the slow movement, Schumann) have little bearing on the symphony's development or character." The opening movement uses a modified sonata form with what Grove describes as "a development-like coda". The second movement contains melodic material and orchestral colours that anticipate The Sorcerer's Apprentice. The symphony has been described as a "charming and colorful work."
