= Viera Janárčeková =

Slovak pianist and composer

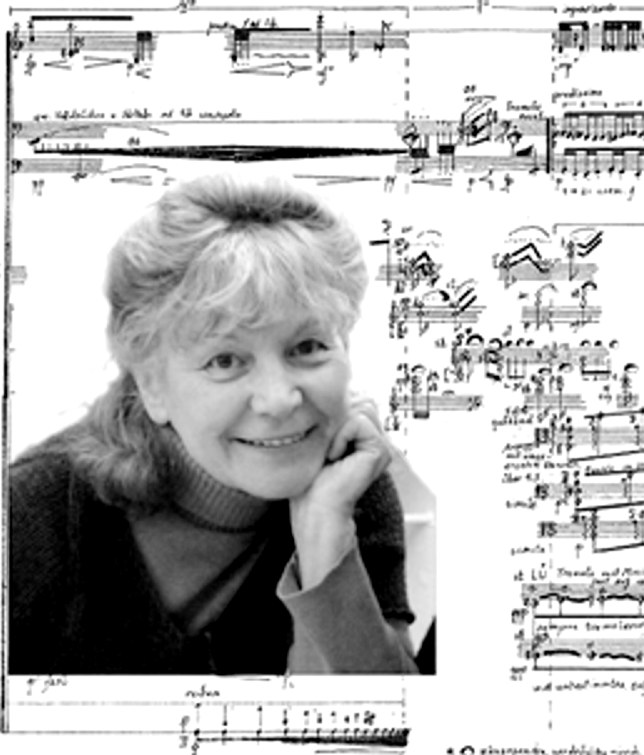
Viera Janárceková portraita

Viera Janárčeková (23 September 1941 - 14 May 2023) was a Slovak pianist and composer.

== Biography ==
Viera Janárčeková was born in Svit, Slovakia. She studied harpsichord and piano the State Conservatory in Bratislava and continued her studies at the Academy of Performing Arts in Prague. She also studied with Rudolf Firkušný in Lucerne. After completing her education in 1967 she taught music and performed as a pianist. She has resided in Homberg, Germany since 1972, and has worked as a composer since 1981. She received an invitation to be composer-in-residence for the International Festival in Lockenhaus in 2000.

She died on 14 May 2023 in Großbottwar.

== Works ==
Janárčeková composes mainly for chamber ensemble and instruments. Selected works include:

- Quadratura for cello
- Banyan for bass clarinet and trombone
- Der geheimnisvolle Nachen
- Aschenputtel trio for clarinet, violincello and piano
- String Quartet No. 5
- String Quartet No. 6
- Sphärenwolf

Her works have been recorded and issued on CD, including:

- Viera Janárčeková Duo extatico - Joriki und Makyo - Das 5. Streichquartett'Freya Ritts-Kirba, Violine - Hellmuth Vivell, Klavier - Martin Weiffenbach, Violoncello - Kairos Quartet
