= La Péri (Dukas) =

1912 ballet by Paul Dukas

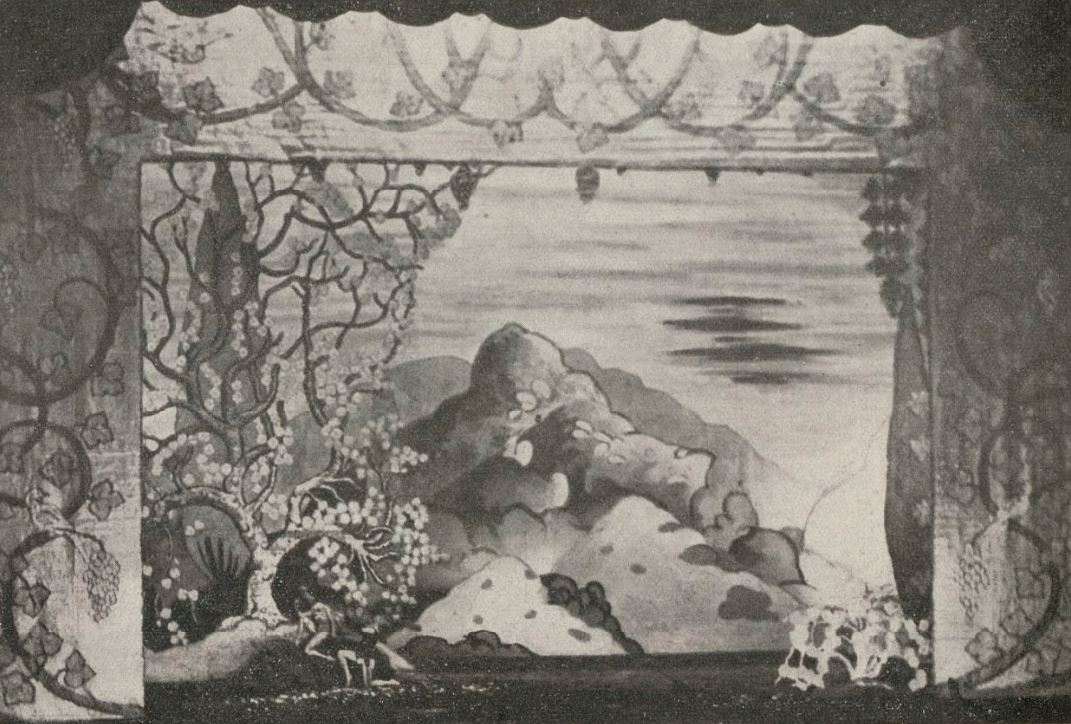
Set by René Piot, 1921.

La Péri (English: The Peri) (Note: The subtitle La Fleur d'Immortalité ("The Flower of Immortality") is not attested in the score nor in the first program.) is a 1912 ballet in one act by French composer Paul Dukas, originally choreographed by Ivan Clustine and first performed in Paris, about Iskender (the name of Alexander the Great in Persian) searching for immortality and his encounter with a mythological Peri. It was premiered on April 22, 1912.

== Synopsis ==
At the end of his days of youth, the Magi having observed that his star had faded, Iskender travels throughout Iran in search of the Flower of Immortality. After three years of looking and wandering, he finally arrives at the Ends of the Earth, a place of utmost tranquility and calm. Iskender finds a temple to Ormuzd, and on its steps is a Peri. With a star flashing above her head and a lute in one hand, the Peri carries the Flower of Immortality, a lotus decorated with emeralds, in the other.

Later, as the Peri is sleeping, Iskender steals the Flower, careful to avoid making noise so that she does not wake up. Immediately the Flower sparkles brightly in his hands, and when the Peri wakes up, she strikes her hands against each other and lets out a great cry, because without the Flower she cannot enter into the presence of the light of Ormuzd. Upon this realization, Iskender delights at the power he now seemingly has over the Peri.

While in his hand, however, the Flower is transformed by Ormuzd to Iskender's earthly and material desires. This is a sign to the Peri that possession of the Flower is not intended for Iskender, and so she performs a dance, gradually coming closer and closer until she is able to wrest the Flower from him. As the Peri slowly disappears in the light and returns to Paradise, Iskender realizes with calmness that he has been stranded and left to die.

== Music ==
The original music to La Péri was written in 1911 by Paul Dukas as a Poème dansé en un tableau ("dance poem in one scene"), his last published work. Although not as well known as his famous symphonic poem The Sorcerer's Apprentice, the ballet has been considered to be one of his most mature and skilled pieces. The music's style can best be described as a mixture of Romantic tonal harmony and orchestration techniques with Impressionism, and is distinctly French. The ballet itself is preceded by a brilliant fanfare that uses the orchestra's brass section, and which is often performed separately.

Dukas scored La Péri for one piccolo (doubling third flute), two flutes, two oboes, one English horn, two clarinets in A, one bass clarinet in B flat, three bassoons; four horns in F, three trumpets in C, three trombones, one tuba; a percussion section that includes timpani, bass drum, snare drum, cymbals, triangle, tambourine and xylophone; one celesta; two harps and strings.

== Performances ==
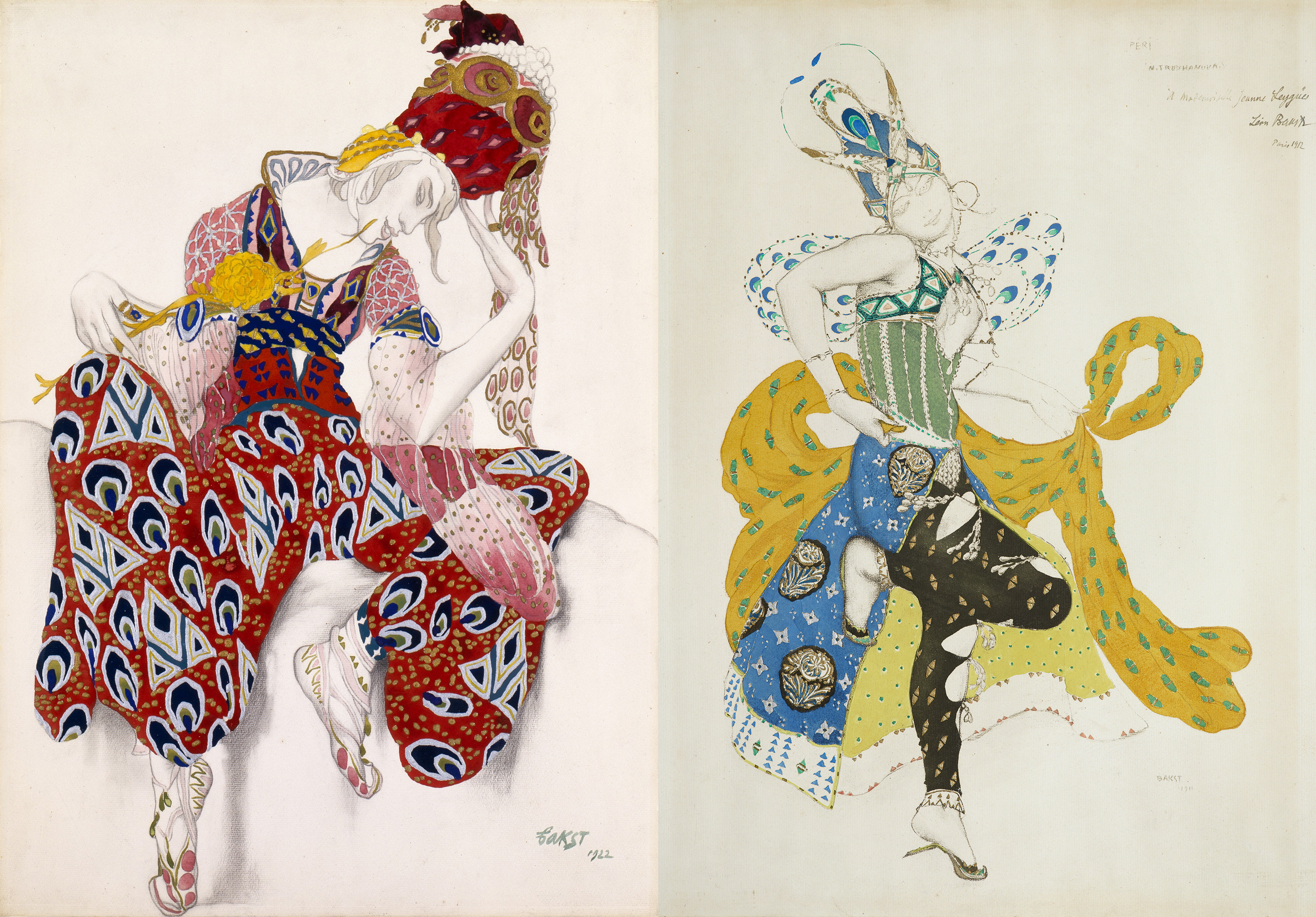
Sketches for Iskender and the Peri's costumes by Léon Bakst, 1922 and 1911.

Dukas had been commissioned to write the music for the Ballets Russes with designs by Léon Bakst, with Natalia Trouhanova as the Peri and Vaslav Nijinsky as Iskender. However, because Serge Diaghilev did not feel that Trouhanova was enough of a skilled dancer to be a partner to Nijinsky, the production was cancelled.

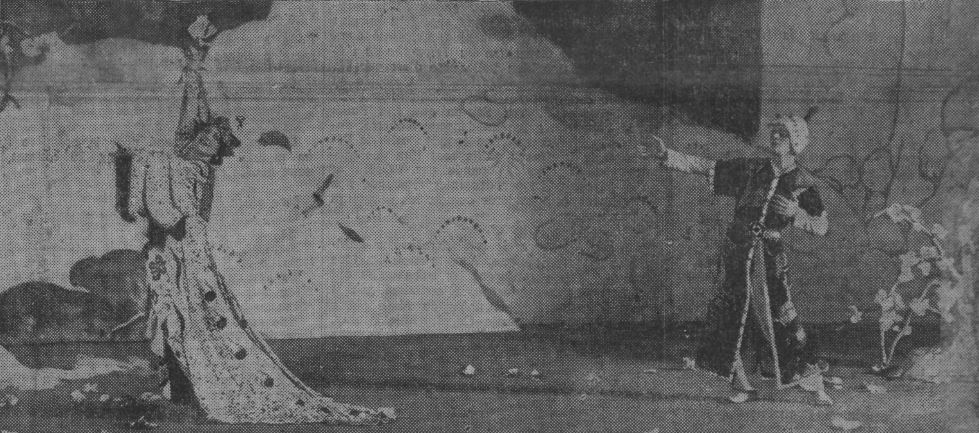
Natacha Trouhanova and Alfred Bekefi, 1912.

Trouhanova eventually commissioned Ivan Clustine to choreograph the music, and the work was premiered at the Théâtre du Châtelet in Paris, on April 22, 1912, with Trouhanova in the title role, Alfred Bekefi as Iskender, designs by René Piot. The Concerts Lamoureux were conducted by the composer, and the other ballets on the programme (also all conducted by their composer) were Vincent d'Indy's Istar, Florent Schmitt's La Tragédie de Salomé, and Maurice Ravel's Adélaïde ou le langage des fleurs.

The ballet entered the Paris Opera's repertoire in 1921, with Anna Pavlova and Hubert Stowitts dancing as the Peri and Iskender and designs by René Piot, and Philippe Gaubert conducting.

The ballet was performed in 1931 by the Ballet Rambert at the Mercury Theatre, Notting Hill Gate in London, to choreography by Frederick Ashton and costume design by William Chappell. Ashton himself danced the role of Iskender, with ballerina Alicia Markova as the Peri. This production was short-lived, lasting only until 1932, but the same company performed the ballet again in 1938 to choreography by Frank Staff, and Ashton in 1956 designed a new version for The Royal Ballet. In this latter version, the two roles were played by Margot Fonteyn and Michael Somes with scenic design by Ivon Hitchens and costume design by André Lavasseur. In Britain it has also been performed at the Lyric Theatre Hammersmith and the Palace Theatre, Manchester.

In 2012 Ivan Putrov used the score to choreograph his first major creation for the stage, at Sadler's Wells Theatre, entitled Ithaca.

Though not common, excerpts from the ballet are still sometimes performed in student competitions.

== See also ==
- La Péri (Burgmüller)

== Sources ==
- Dukas, Paul. La Péri - Poème dansé en un Tableau Paris: M.M. Durand & Cie, 1911. (synopsis, instrumentation)
- The Rambert Dance Company. Archive - La Péri. Retrieved February 25, 2006. (production information)
