= Polyeucte (Dukas) =

1891 overture composed by Paul Dukas

Polyeucte is an overture composed by Paul Dukas in 1891 for the tragedy of the same name by Pierre Corneille. Dukas made his public debut with the first performance of this overture on 23 January 1892 at the Concerts Lamoureux.
