= Demetrius Constantine Dounis =

Violinist, violist and teacher (1893–1954)

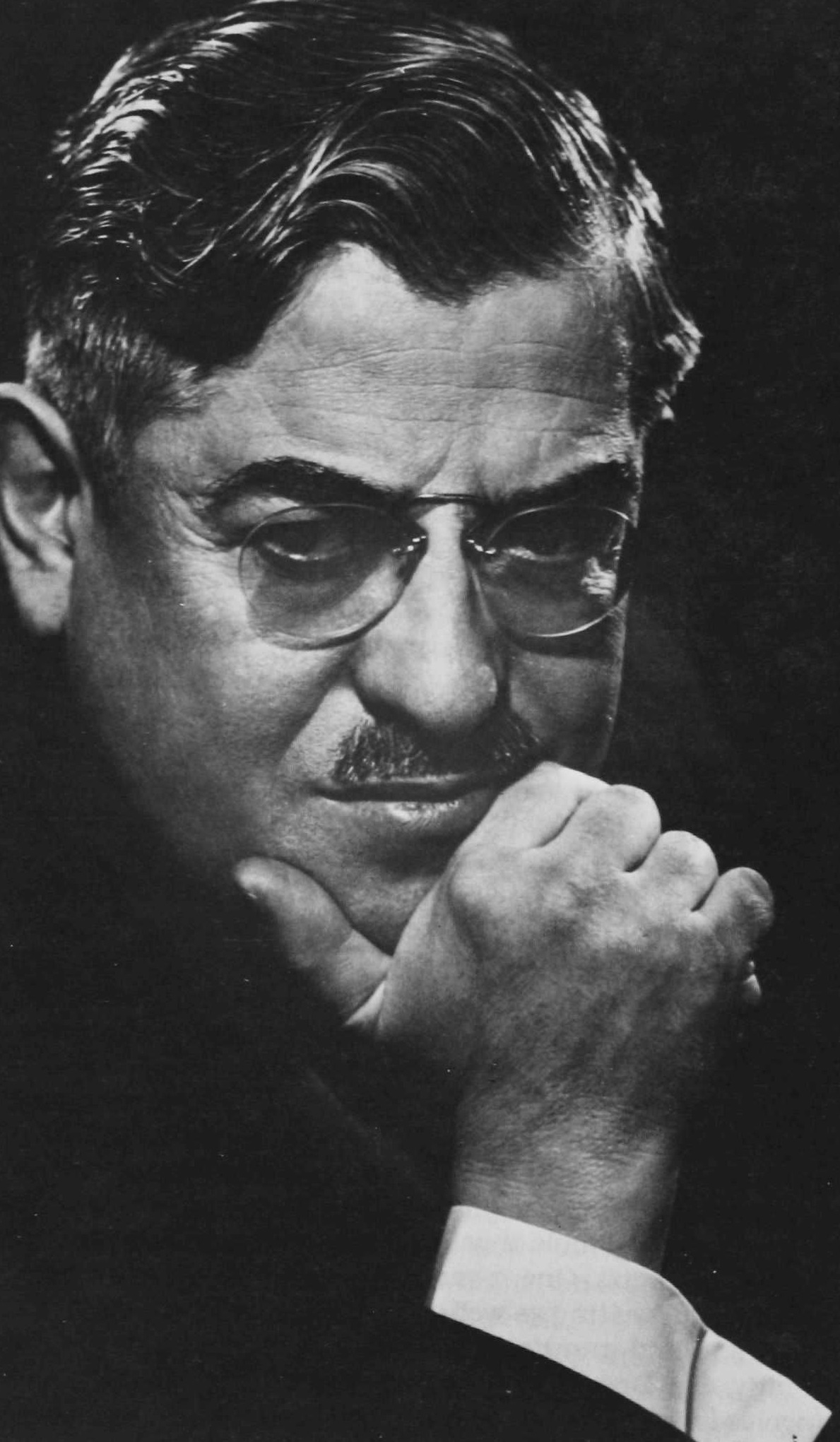
D.C. Dounis

Demetrius Constantine Dounis (also Demetrios), also known as D. C. Dounis (Greek: Δημήτριος Κωνσταντίνος Δούνης; 21 December 1893 – August 13, 1954), was an influential teacher of violin and string instrument technique, as well as violinist, violist, and mandolin player.

== Life and work ==
Considerable uncertainty prevails on the subject of Dounis's early life, beginning with the date of his birth in Athens, variously given as 1886 (according to most library catalogues), 1893, or 1894. He is said to have performed his first violin recital at the age of 7 and to have toured the United States as a mandolinist at 14. He made his debut on the mandolin at the Carnegie Lyceum, New York, on November 16, 1910. He was signed as a New Edison Artist on the mandolin in 1911 and made an Edison recording of the Prelude by Raffaele Calace, opus 45, No. 1. In Athens, he participated in the famous Athenian Mandolinata, conducted by Nikolaos Lavdas. He studied under František Ondříček in Vienna, where he also took a medical degree, specializing in neurology and psychiatry. He also studied in Paris with César Thomson. After World War I, when he served as a doctor in the Greek army, he was appointed to the chair in violin at the State Conservatory of Thessaloniki, but soon established himself in the United States.

Dounis focused his early medical career on treating professional musicians from the world's major symphony orchestras. He would work with a musician for at least six months, observing the musician's technique, asking questions, and devising new exercises to indirectly address the problem. Dounis also wrote several instructional books. In his 1921 volume The Artist's Technique of Violin Playing, Dounis emphasized the importance of shifting and finger exercises. These were to develop the musician's mental map at the beginning of practice, after which scale drills would be more effective.

== Selected works ==
Dounis Violin Pedagogics

- The Artist's Technique of Violin Playing: A New Scientific Method for Obtaining, in the Shortest Possible Time, an Absolute Mastery of the Higher Technical Difficulties of the Left Hand and of the Bow, Op. 12 (1921)

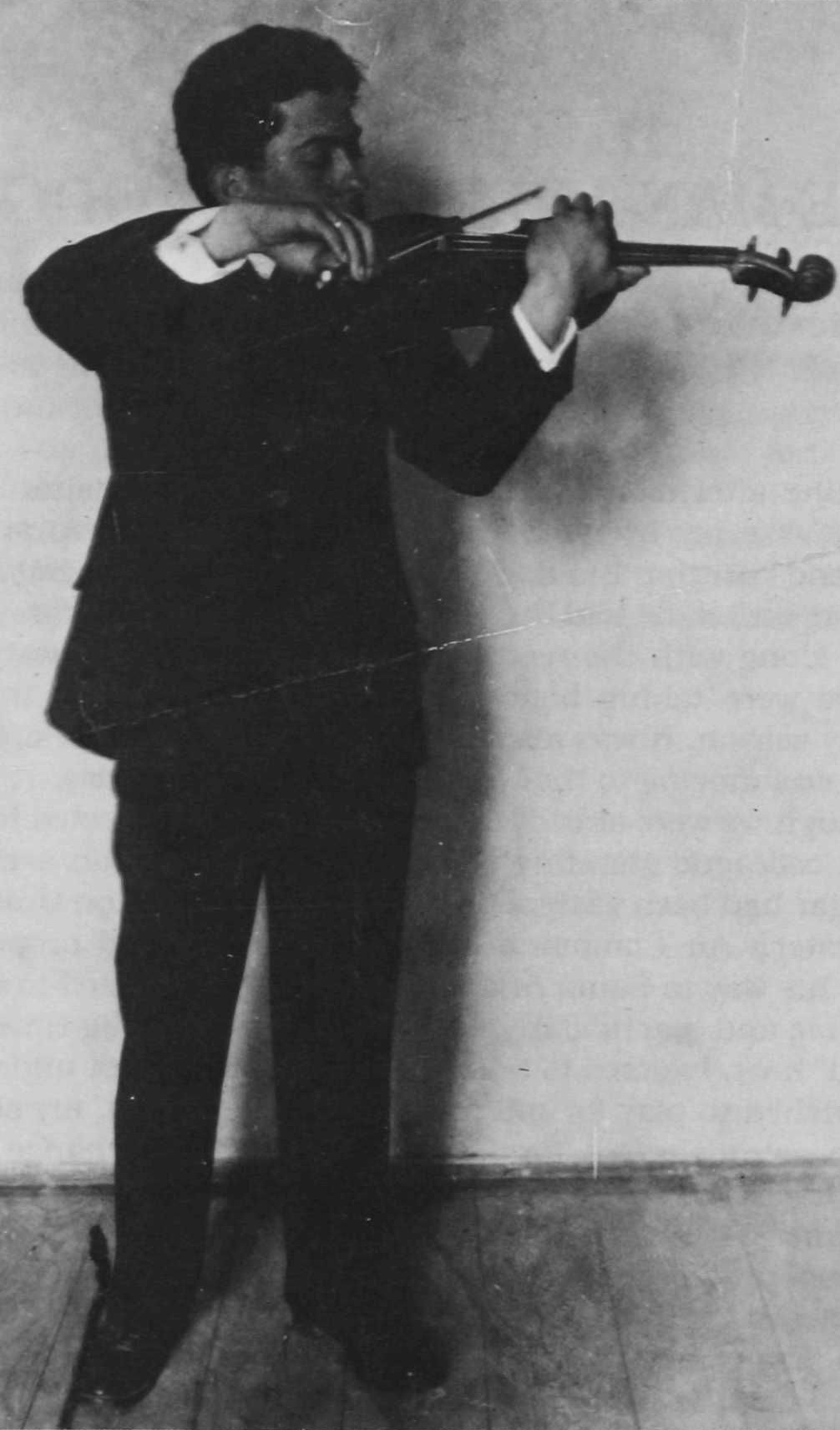
D.C. Dounis, Age 20

1. First Part: The Left Hand
2. Second Part: The Bow

- The Absolute Independence of the Fingers in Violin Playing on a Scientific Basis (in 2 Books), Op. 15 (1924)

1. The Absolute Independence of Three Fingers
2. The Absolute Independence of Four Fingers

- Preparatory Studies in Thirds and Fingered Octaves on a Scientific Basis for Violin, Op. 16 (1924)

1. Thirds
2. Fingered Octaves

- Fundamental Trill Studies on a Scientific Basis for Violin, Op. 18 (1925)
- The Dounis Violin Players' Daily Dozen to Keep the Violinist Technically Fit for the Day's Work: Twelve Fundamental Exercises for the Left Hand and the Bow, Op. 20 (1925)
- The Staccato (The Accented Legato, the Accented Staccato): Studies on a Scientific Basis for the Highest Development in Staccato-Playing on the Violin, Op. 21 (1925)
- Preparatory Studies in Octaves and Tenths on a Scientific Basis, Op. 22 (1928)

1. Octaves
2. Tenths

- Fundamental Technical Studies on a Scientific Basis for the Young Violinist, Op. 23 (1935)
- Specific Technical Exercises for Viola (Left Hand – Bow Arm), Op. 25 (1941)
- New Aids to the Technical Development of the Violinist, Op. 27 (1935)

1. The Independence of the Bow from the Left Hand
2. A Neglected Phase in the Study of Thirds

- Studies in Chromatic Double-Stops for the Violin, Op. 29 (1942)
- The Higher Development of Thirds and Fingered Octaves: Twenty-four Advanced Formulas for the Violin, Op. 30 (1944)
- Advanced Studies for the Development of the Independence of the Fingers in Violin Playing on a Scientific Basis, Op. 33 (1945)
- The Development of Flexibility in Violin Playing: Studies on Scientific Principles for the Fingers and the Bow, Op. 35 (1945)
- Chopin Étude, Op. 25 No. 6 for Violin (in 2 Books) (1945); technical studies after Frédéric Chopin's Étude, Op. 25 No. 6

1. In Thirds
2. In Tenths

- The Development of Flexibility, Studies on Scientific Principles for Violin, Book II: Change of Position Studies, Op. 36 (1947)
- Essential Scale Studies, on Scientific Basis, for the Development of the Rhythmic Impulse of the Fingers for Violin, Op. 37 (1947)

== References and further reading ==
- Constantakos, Chris A. (1997). Demetrios Constantine Dounis : his method in teaching the violin. American University Studies 14: Education, vol. 13 (second revised ed.). New York: Lang. ISBN 978-0-8204-3895-5.
- Eaton, Sybil (October 1954). "Dr. D.C. Dounis, a great violin teacher". Musical Times: 559.
- Wrochem, Claudius von (2001). "Dounis, Demetrios Constantine". Die Musik in Geschichte und Gegenwart. Vol. Personenteil 5. Kassel: Bärenreiter. pp. 1345–46.
- Wasson, George Dwayne and John M. Geringer (January 2006). Elevators and escalators: the study of an innovative approach to teaching fingerboard geography to heterogeneous string classes. Theses and Dissertations from the University of Texas at Austin (Thesis). pp. 10–12. hdl:2152/561.
