= Natalia Vladimirovna Trouhanowa =

French ballet dancer of Ukrainian origin

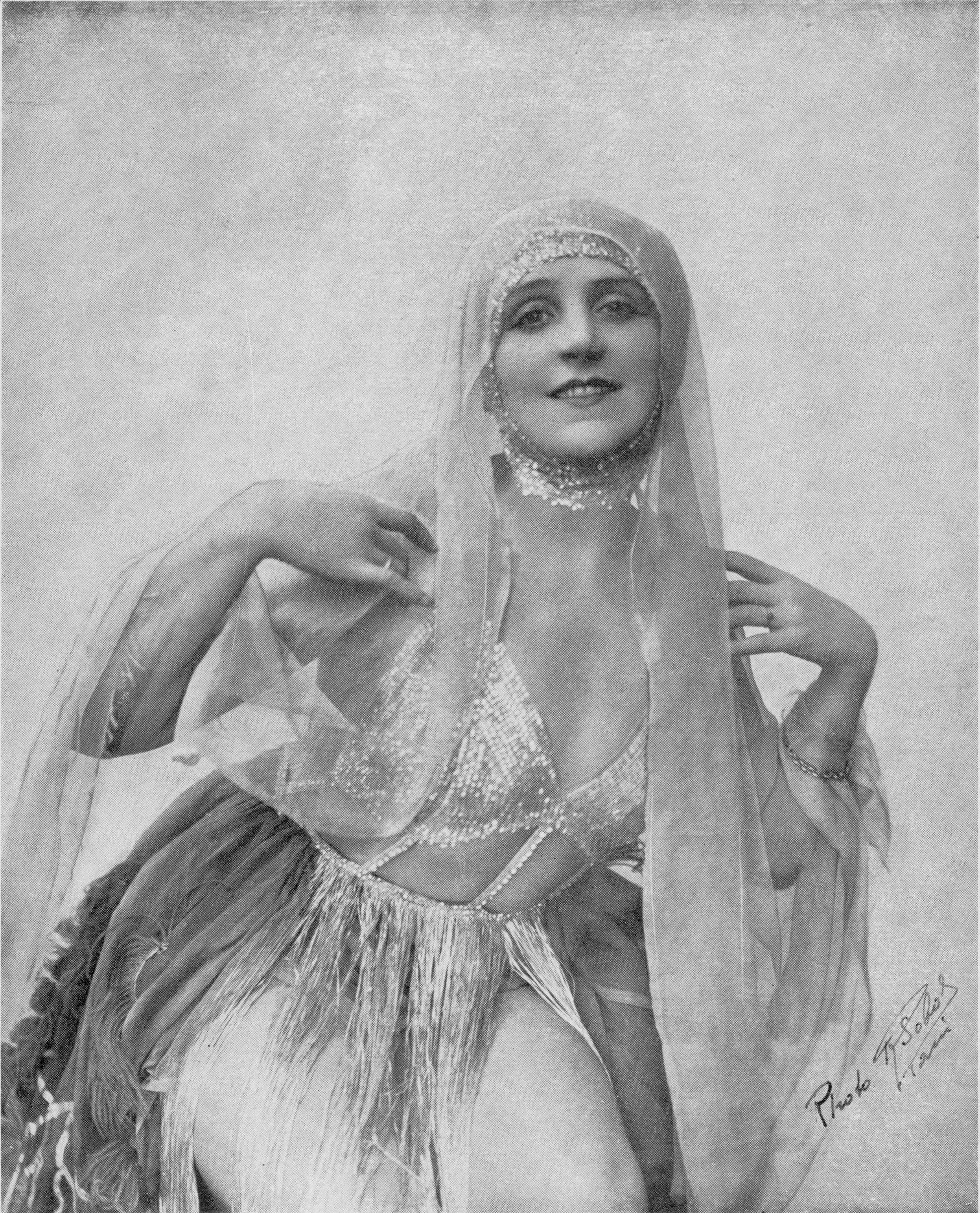
- Trouhanowa in a 1921 publication
- Born: April 11, 1885; Kyiv, Russian Empire
- Died: August 1956; Moscow, Soviet Union
- Other names: Natalia Trouhanova; Natalia Trukhanova; Natacha Trouhanowa-Ignatieff
- Occupation: Dancer

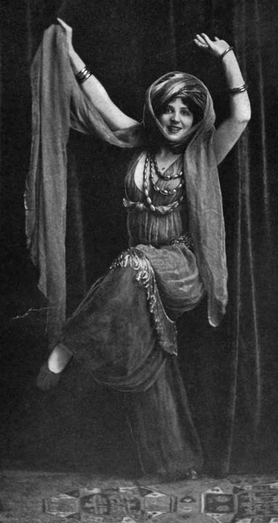
Trouhanowa in a 1912 publication

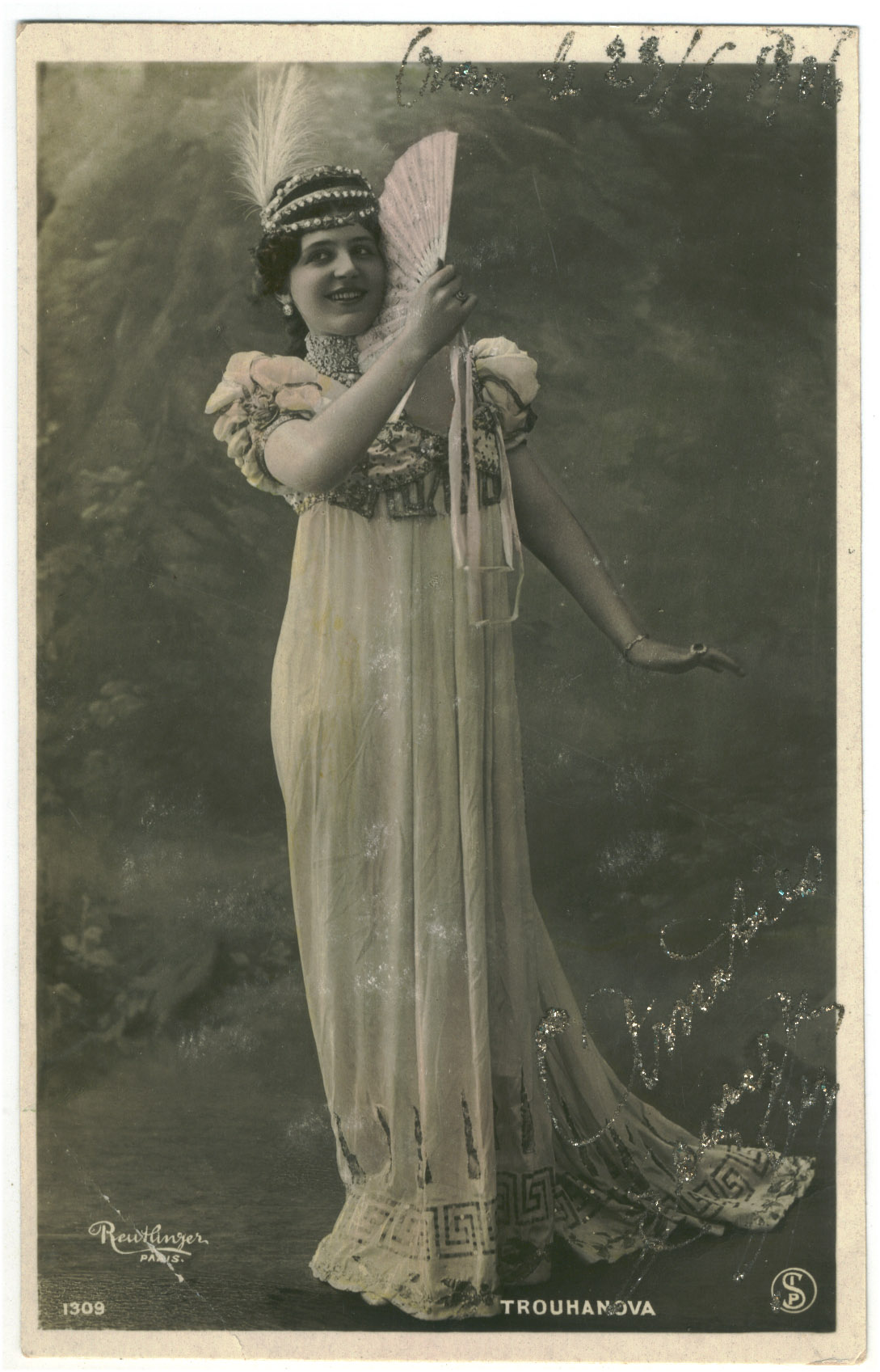
Natacha Trouhanova, by Reutlinger

Natalia Vladimirovna Trouhanowa (in Cyrillic, Наталья Владимировна Труханова; 1885 – August 1956), also seen as Natalia Trouhanova, Natalia Trukhanova, or Natacha Trouhanowa-Ignatieff, was a French dancer born in Kyiv.

== Career ==
Trouhanowa was born into a musical family; her father was an opera singer in Kyiv, Vladimir Bostunov. She made international news for wearing extravagant diamonds on stage at Monte Carlo in 1906. She was known for dancing the part of Salome in various Paris productions, including in Richard Strauss's Salome (1907, dancing for singer Emmy Destinn), in Antoine Mariotte's opera Salomé (1910, dancing for singer Lucienne Bréval), and in Florent Schmitt's La tragédie de Salomé (1912). She also premiered Paul Dukas's La Péri and Maurice Ravel's Adelaide, or the Language of Flowers in 1912, and acted the part of "the Nun" in Max Reinhardt's The Miracle (1912). In 1914, she danced at Rheims for the Sixth Olympic Congress.

She had a well-publicized confrontation with Richard Strauss in 1907, when he refused to let her take a curtain call as Salomé, next to the singer of the part, "as he considered the art of dancing was an inferior one"; she left the production and described the insult in a letter to the press.

She appeared in several French silent films, mostly short films, beginning with The Ugly Girl in 1909, and ending with Léda and La forêt qui écoute in 1916. She retired from the stage when she married in 1918, but returned in 1921.

== Personal life ==
Trouhanowa owned a house in Paris, and was known for her love of swimming topless as well as dancing.

Natalia Bostunova was married briefly as a teenager to Boris Trouhanov. In 1913 she was rumored to be romantically involved with the troubled Duke of Leinster, "decidedly the most eligible of all British bachelors", but that she refused to leave dancing for the title of Duchess. Instead she married Alexei A. Ignatieff, a Russian count living in Paris. They ran a small farm together after World War I, and moved back to Russia together in 1936. She died in 1956, aged 71 years, in Moscow. There is a box of letters to Trouhanowa, and a manuscript of her memoirs, in the Houghton Library at Harvard University.
