= Schweizerische Gesellschaft für Neue Musik =

Music organisation

The Schweizerische Gesellschaft für Neue Musik (SGNM; French Société Suisse de Musique Contemporaine, SSMC; Italian Società Svizzera per la Musica Contemporanea, SSMC; English. ISCM Switzerland) is the national section of the International Society for Contemporary Music (ISCM). It is organised as an association and is legally domiciled in Lausanne.

== History ==
The IGNM Switzerland was founded in October 1922 at the initiative of the Winterthur patron Werner Reinhart, making it one of the first ISCM country sections in the world. Reinhart, who served as the 1st ISCM Secretary General, had already been instrumental in founding the umbrella organisation in June 1922. The founding president of IGNM Switzerland was the composer and conductor Volkmar Andreae from Zurich. From 1946 until 2001, on an initiative of Paul Sacher, IGNM Switzerland shared the secretariat with the Swiss Tonkünstlerverband. In 1995, at the Künstlerhaus Boswil, the IGNM Switzerland was renamed the Swiss Society for New Music (SGNM/SSMC) with the aim of promoting Neue Musik.

Local groups of Swiss IGNM in cities such as Basel, Bern, Lausanne, La Chaux-de-Fonds, Lucerne, Central Switzerland, St. Gallen and Valais as well as various festivals and ensembles for New Music are members of the SGNM.

To date, the association has hosted the ISCM World Music Days a total of six times: in 1926 (Zurich), 1929 (Geneva), 1957 (Zurich), 1970 (Basel), 1991 (Zurich) and the ISCM World Music Days 2004 under the direction of Mathias Steinauer with the motto "Trans it."

The World Music Days held in Switzerland have included several world premieres of music-historical significance, such as the highly praised premiere of Anton Webern's 5 orchestral pieces op. 10, in 1926 under his direction, and the staged premiere of Arnold Schoenberg's opera fragment Moses und Aron in 1957 in Zurich. In 1957 - also in Zurich - electronic music was played for the first time in ISCM World Music Days history.

== List of presidents ==
Volkmar Andreae (1922, until 1928 in personal union with the STV Presidium), Hans Ehinger (1934, ad interim), Paul Sacher (1935, from 1946 in personal union with the STV Presidium), Samuel Baud-Bovy (1955, in personal union with the STV Presidium), Paul Müller-Zürich (1960, in personal union with the STV Presidium), Constantin Regamey (1963, in personal union with the STV Presidium), Hermann Haller (1968, in personal union with the STV Presidium), Julien-François Zbinden (1973, in personal union with the STV Presidium), Francis Travis (1974), Fritz Muggler (1978), Jean-Luc Darbellay (1995), Max E. Keller (2007), Nicolas Farine (2010), Javier Hagen (2014). (Year of inception in brackets)
