= Neue Musik =

Music school

New music (German: Neue Musik; French: nouvelle musique) is the collective term for a wealth of different currents in composed Western art music from around 1910 to the present – the period known as contemporary classical music. It is characterised in particular by – sometimes radical – expansions of tonal, harmonic, melodic and rhythmic means and forms. It is also characterised by the search for new sounds, new forms or new combinations of old styles, which is partly a continuation of existing traditions, partly a deliberate break with tradition and appears either as progress or as renewal (neo- or post-styles).

Roughly speaking, Neue Musik can be divided into the period from around 1910 to the Second World War – often referred to as "modernism" – and the reorientation after the Second World War, which is perceived as "radical" – usually apostrophised as avant-garde – up to the present. The latter period is sometimes subdivided into the 1950s, 1960s and 1970s, whereby the following decades have not yet been further differentiated (the summary term "postmodernism" has not become established).

In order to describe contemporary music in a narrower sense, the term Zeitgenössische Musik (English contemporary music, French musique contemporaine) is used without referring to a fixed periodisation. The term "Neue Musik" was coined by the music journalist Paul Bekker in 1919.

Representatives of Neue Musik are sometimes called Neutöner.

== Compositional means and styles ==
The most important step in the reorientation of musical language was taken in the field of harmony, namely the gradual abandonment of tonality – towards free atonality and finally towards twelve-tone technique. Towards the end of the 19th century, the tendency to use increasingly complex chord formations led to harmonic areas that could no longer be clearly explained by the underlying major-minor tonality – a process that had already begun with Wagner and Liszt. From this, Arnold Schönberg and his students Alban Berg and Anton Webern drew the most systematic consequence, which culminated in the formulation (1924) of the method of "composition with twelve tones related only to one another" (dodecaphony). These atonal rules of composition provide composers with a toolkit that helps to avoid the principles of tonality. The designation as "Second Viennese School" in analogy to the "First Viennese School" (Haydn, Mozart, Beethoven) already betrays the special position that this group of composers has as a mediating authority.

The principle of using all twelve tones of the tempered scale equally, without favouring individual tones, seems to have occupied various composers in the first two decades of the 20th century, who simultaneously, but independently of Schönberg, advanced to similarly bold results. Among these experimenters, in whose works twelve-tone and serial approaches can be discerned, is first of all Josef Matthias Hauer, who publicly argued with Schönberg about the "copyright" to twelve-tone music. Also to be mentioned is Alexander Scriabin, whose atonal sound-centre technique, based on quartal layering, subsequently paved the way for remarkable experiments by a whole generation of young Russian composers. The significance of this generation of composers for New Music, which emerged in the climate of the revolutions of 1905 and 1917, could only penetrate into consciousness in the second half of the century, as they were already systematically eliminated by the Stalinist dictatorship in the late 1920s. Here, Nikolai Roslavets, Arthur Lourié, Alexander Mossolov and Ivan Wyschnegradsky should be mentioned as representatives.

A major shortcoming of the abandonment of major-minor tonality, however, was the extensive loss of the form-forming forces of this harmonic system. Composers countered this deficiency in very different ways. In order to avoid the classical-romantic musical forms, they now chose for the new music partly free (rhapsody, fantasy), or neutral (concert, orchestral piece) designations, or self-chosen, sometimes extremely short, aphoristic forms (Webern, Schönberg). Others adhered to traditional forms, even though their works themselves took this concept ad absurdum, or filled the traditional ideas of form with new content (Scriabin's single-movement piano sonatas, Schoenberg's sonata forms with the abandonment of the tonality that founded them in the first place). Even the fundamental idea of a continuous, purposeful processing of musical thoughts within a work loses its primacy, parallel to the loss of the 19th century's belief in progress. New possibilities of shaping form, beyond parameters of music, which had previously been treated rather stepmotherly, such as timbre, rhythm, dynamics, systematic resp. Free montage techniques in Igor Stravinsky or Charles Ives, the rejection of the time directionality of music, as well as an increasing individualism claim their place.

A musical source whose potential was also used for experimentation is folklore. While previous generations of composers had repeatedly chosen exotic subjects in order to legitimise structures that deviated from the prevailing rules of composition, it was in the work of Claude Debussy that a stylistic and structural adaptation of Javanese gamelan music, which he had become acquainted with in 1889 at the Paris 1889 World's Fair, can be observed for the first time. In this context, the work of Béla Bartók, who had already explored most of the fundamental characteristics of his new style by means of a systematic study of Balkan folklore in 1908, is to be regarded as exemplary. In the course of this development, Bartók arrived at the treatment of the "piano as a percussion instrument" with his Allegro barbaro (1911), which subsequently had a decisive influence on composers' treatment of this instrument. The rhythmic complexities peculiar to Slavic folklore were also appropriated by Igor Stravinsky in his early ballet compositions written for Sergei Diaghilev's Ballets Russes. Significantly, Stravinsky uses a given "barbaric-pagan" stage plot for his most revolutionary experiment in this respect (The Rite of Spring 1913).

It was also Stravinsky who, in the further course of the 1910s, developed his compositional style in a direction that became exemplary for Neoclassicism. In France, various young composers appeared on the scene who devoted themselves to a similar emphatically anti-romantic aesthetic. The Groupe des Six was formed around Erik Satie, whose leading theoretician was Jean Cocteau. In Germany, Paul Hindemith was the most prominent representative of this movement. The proposal to use the canon of musical forms, such as the Baroque, to renew the musical language had already been put forward by Ferruccio Busoni in his Draft of a New Aesthetic of Musical Art. In the spring of 1920, Busoni formulated this idea again in an essay entitled Young Classicism.

Furthermore, the radical experiments devoted to the possibilities of microtonal music are exceptional. These include Alois Hába, who, encouraged by Busoni, found his preconditions in Bohemian-Moravian musicianship, and on the other hand Ivan Wyschnegradsky, whose microtonality is to be understood as a consistent further development of the sound-centre technique of Alexander Scriabin. In the wake of the Italian Futurism around Filippo Tommaso Marinetti and Francesco Balilla Pratella, which was based in the visual arts, Luigi Russolo in his manifesto The Art of Noises (1913, 1916) designed a style called Bruitism, which made use of newly constructed sound generators, the so-called intonarumori.

The spectrum of musical expression is extended by another interesting experiment that also enters the realm of the musical application of sounds, namely the tone cluster by Henry Cowell. Some of the early piano pieces by Leo Ornstein and George Antheil also tend towards quite comparable tone clusters. With Edgar Varèse and Charles Ives, two composers should be mentioned whose works, which are exceptional in every respect, cannot be attributed to any larger movement and whose significance was only fully recognised in the second half of the century.

The increasing industrialisation, which slowly began to take hold of all areas of life, is reflected in an enthusiasm for technology and (compositional) machine aesthetics, which was initially carried by the Futurist movement. Thus, the various technical innovations, such as the invention of the vacuum tube, the development of radio technology, the sound film and tape technology, moved into the musical field of vision. These innovations also favoured the development of new electric playing instruments, which is also significant with regard to the original compositions created for them. Lew Termen's Theremin, Friedrich Trautwein's trautonium and the Ondes Martenot of the Frenchman Maurice Martenot should be highlighted here. The partly enthusiastic hope for progress that was attached to the musically useful application of these early experiments was, however, only partially fulfilled. Nevertheless, the new instruments and technical developments possessed a musically inspiring potential that, in the case of some composers, was reflected in extraordinarily visionary conceptions that could only actually be technically realised decades later. The first compositional explorations of the musical possibilities of pianola also belong in this context. The medial dissemination of music by means of records and radio also made possible the enormously accelerated exchange or reception of musical developments that had been almost unknown until then, as can be seen from the rapid popularisation and reception of jazz. In general, it can be said that the period from around 1920 onwards was one of general "departure for new shores" – with many very different approaches. Essentially, this pluralism of styles has been preserved until today or, after a short period of mutual polemics between Serialism and adherents of traditional compositional styles (from about the mid-1950s onwards), has ceased again.

== Historical preconditions ==
In the 20th century, a line of development of musical progress continued; every composer still known today has contributed something to it. This old longing for progress and modernity – through conscious separation from tradition and convention – can, however, take on a fetish-like character in Western society, which is shaped by science and technology. The appearance of the "new" is always accompanied by a feeling of uncertainty and scepticism. At the beginning of the 20th century, the use of music and the discussion of its meaning and purpose was still reserved for an infinitesimally small, but all the more knowledgeable part of society. This relationship – the small elite group of privileged people here and the large uninvolved masses there – has only changed outwardly through the increasing dissemination of music through the media. Today, music is accessible to everyone, but as far as understanding "Neue Musik" is concerned, there is a lack of education in many cases, including that of the ear. The changed relationship between man and music has made aesthetic questions about the nature and purpose of music a public debate.

In the history of music, transitional phases (epoch boundaries) arose in which the "old" and the "new" appeared simultaneously. The traditional period or epoch was still cultivated, but parallel to this a "Neue musik" was introduced which subsequently replaced it. These transitions were always understood by contemporaries as phases of renewal and were described accordingly. The Ars Nova of the 14th century, for example, also has "new" in its name, and Renaissance also characterises a consciously chosen new beginning. The transitional phases are usually characterised by an increase in stylistic means, in which these – in the sense of mannerism – are exaggerated to the point of absurdity. The stylistic change to the "new" music then takes place, for example, through the removal of one of the traditional stylistic means, on the basis of which a compositional-aesthetic progress can then be systematically striven for and realised, or on the gradual preference for alternatives introduced in parallel.

In this sense, the classical Romantic music of the 19th century can be understood as an intensification of Viennese classicism. The increase in means is most noticeable here in the quantitative aspect – the length and instrumentation of Romantic orchestral compositions increased drastically. In addition, the composers' increased need for expression and extra-musical (poetic) content came more into focus. The attempts to create musical national styles must also be seen as a reaction to the various revolutionary social events of the century. Furthermore, the economic conditions for musicians, based on patronage and publishing, changed. Social and political circumstances affected the composition of the audience and the organisation of concert life. In addition, there was a strong individualisation (personal style) of the Romantic musical language(s).

== Historical overview ==
The following overview provides only a keyword-like orientation about the corresponding periods, outstanding composers, rough style characteristics and masterpieces. Corresponding in-depth information is then reserved for the main articles.

- Any periodisation is a shortening. In many cases, the sometimes seemingly contradictory styles not only took place simultaneously, but many composers also composed in several styles – sometimes even in one and the same work.
- Even if one composer appears to be outstanding for a style or period, there has always been a multitude of composers who have also written exemplary works in a sometimes very independent manner. The following applies: every successful work deserves its own consideration and classification – regardless of the framework in which it is usually placed for stylistic reasons.
- Basically, the dictum of Rudolf Stephan applies to the classification of works into styles: "If, however, stylistic criteria [...] are presupposed, then [...] such [works] by numerous other, mostly younger composers [...] can also be counted [...] But in the case of works [...] (which can certainly be named in this context), boundaries then become perceptible which perhaps cannot be fixed exactly, but which are nevertheless (to speak with Maurice Merleau-Ponty) quickly noticed as having already been crossed. " A fixed stylistic or epochal scheme does not exist and is in principle impossible. All attributions of similarities or differences are interpretations that require precise explanation. The fact that works are classified partly according to stylistic terms (for example "expressionism") and partly according to compositional criteria (e.g. "atonality") inevitably leads to multiple overlaps.

=== The turn from the 19th to the 20th century ===
The traditional compositional means of the classical period were only able to cope with these increasing tendencies to a certain extent. Towards the end of the 19th century, the musical development began to take shape in which Paul Bekker then retrospectively recognised "New Music" (as a term it was only later written with a capital "N"). His attention had initially been particularly focused on Gustav Mahler, Franz Schreker, Ferruccio Busoni and Arnold Schönberg. Overall, the turn of the century had come to be understood as fin de siècle. In any case, it was under the auspices of modernity, as the radicalisation of which the "new music" can be regarded and whose manifold consequences influenced the entire 20th century. The qualitative difference of this epochal transition from the earlier ones is essentially that now some composers saw their historical mission in developing the "new" out of tradition and consistently searching for new means and ways to replace the outdated classical-romantic aesthetics would be able to completely replace.

The deliberate break with tradition is the most striking feature of this transitional phase. The will to renew gradually encompasses all stylistic means (harmony, melody, rhythm, dynamics, form, orchestration, etc.). The new musical styles of the turn of the century, however, still clearly stand in the context of 19th century tradition. Early Expressionism inherits Romanticism and increases its (psychologised) expressive will, Impressionism refines timbres, etc. But soon those parameters were also taken into account and used for musical experiments that had previously had only marginal importance, such as rhythm, or – as a significant novelty - the inclusion of sounds as musically formable material. The progressive mechanisation of urban living conditions found expression in Futurism. Another significant aspect is the equal coexistence of very different procedures in dealing with and in relation to tradition. In any case, "Neue musik" cannot be understood as a superordinate style, but can only be identified on the basis of individual composers or even individual works in the various styles. The 20th century thus appears as a century of polystylistics.

At first, the "new" was neither accepted without comment nor welcomed by the majority of the audience. The premiere of particularly advanced pieces regularly led to the most violent reactions on the part of the audience, which in their drastic nature seem rather alienating today. The vivid descriptions of various legendary scandalous performances (e.g. Richard Strauss' Salome 1905, Stravinsky's The Rite of Spring 1913) with scuffles, key whistles, police intervention etc., as well as the journalistic response with blatant polemics and crude defamations testify to the difficult position that the "Neutöner" had from the beginning. After all, "new music" still seems to have met with a surprisingly high level of public interest at this early stage. However, with increasing acceptance by the public, a certain ("scandalous") expectation also set in. This in turn resulted in a discreet compulsion for originality, modernity and novelty, which entailed the danger of fashionable flattening and routine repetition.

The composers of New Music did not make it easy for themselves, nor for their listeners and performers. Regardless of the nature of their musical experiments, they seem to have quickly found that audiences were helpless and uncomprehending in the face of their sometimes very demanding creations. This was all the more disappointing for many, since it was the very same audience that unanimously applauded the masters of the classical-romantic tradition, whose legitimate heirs they saw themselves as. As a result, the need to explain the new was recognised. Many composers therefore endeavoured to provide the theoretical and aesthetic underpinnings needed to understand their works. In particular, musicological and music-theoretical writings, such as Schönberg's or Busonis visionary Entwurf einer neuen Ästhetik der Tonkunst (1906) are of great influence on the development of New Music. Also noteworthy in this context is the almanac Der Blaue Reiter (1912) edited by Kandinsky and Marc, which contains, among other things, an essay on Free Music by the Russian Futurist Nikolai Kulbin. This willingness to engage intellectually and technically with the unsolved problems of tradition, as well as the sometimes unbending attitude in the pursuit of set compositional goals and experimental arrangements, are further characteristic features of Neue Musik.

The stylistic pluralism that emerged under these conditions continues into the present. In this respect, the term "Neue Musik" is suitable neither as a designation for an epoch nor as a style. Rather, it has a qualitative connotation that is related to the degree of originality (in the sense of novel or unheard-of) of the production method as well as the final result. Expressionism and Impressionism, but also styles of visual art such as Futurism and Dadaism provide aesthetic foundations on which new music can be created. Perhaps the composers and works that have been able to establish themselves as "classics of modernism" in the concert hall in the course of the last century and whose innovations have found their way into the canon of compositional techniques can best be understood under the heading of "new music": Thus, in addition to Arnold Schoenberg and Anton Webern, Igor Stravinsky, Phillipp Jarnach, Béla Bartók and Paul Hindemith. The depiction and assessment of historical development on the basis of an assumed "rivalry" between Schoenberg and Stravinsky is a construct that can be traced back to Theodor W. Adorno. The Second World War represents a clear caesura. Many of the early stylistic, formal and aesthetic experiments of New Music then pass into the canon of compositional tools taught from mid-century onwards and passed on to a younger generation of composers of (again) New Music. In this respect, the technical innovations of sound recording and radio technology are also causally linked to New Music. First of all, they contributed significantly to the popularisation of music and also brought about a change in audience structure. Furthermore, they provided – for the first time in the history of music – an insight into the history of the interpretation of old and new music. They ultimately made possible the (technically reproduced) presence of all music. Moreover, this technique itself is a novelty, whose musical potential was systematically explored from the beginning and used by composers in corresponding compositional experiments.

=== Modernism (1900–1933) ===
==== Impressionism: Debussy – Ravel – Dukas ====
Impressionism is the transfer of the term from the visual arts to a music from about 1890 to the First World War in which tonal "atmosphere" dominates and colourful intrinsic value is emphasised. It differs from the late Romanticism that took place at the same time, with its heavy overloading, by Mediterranean lightness and agility (which does not exclude spooky or shadowy moods) and by avoiding complex counterpoint and excessive chromaticism in favour of sensitive tone colouring, especially in orchestral instrumentation. The centre of this movement is France, the main representatives being Claude Debussy, Maurice Ravel (who, however, also composed many works that cannot be described as impressionistic) and Paul Dukas.

The moment of colour, freedom of form and a penchant for exoticism are what musical works have in common with those of painting. Through the Paris World's Fair of 1889, Claude Debussy learned the sound of Javanese gamelan ensembles, which strongly influenced him, as did the chinoiserie of his time. In addition to the use of pentatonics (for example in Préludes I, Les collines d'Anacapri) and whole-tone scales (for example in Préludes I, Voiles), Debussy made use of the salon music of the time. (for example, Préludes I, Minstrels) and harmonies borrowed from early jazz music (as in Children's Corner and Golliwogg's Cakewalk). Like Ravel, Debussy loved the colour of Spanish dance music.

The fact that some of Debussy's works, which satisfy the characteristics of Impressionism, can also be attributed to Art Nouveau, Jugendstil or Symbolism for good reasons only shows that the pictorial/literary parallels do bear some common stylistic features, but that no clear stylistic attribution can be derived from them.

The characteristics of impressionist music are:

- Melodic: coloured by pentatonic, church keys, whole tone scales and exotic scales; their core form is closely related to the chordal; often rambling, meandering, without a clear internal structure.
- Harmonics: dissolution of the cadence as a structure-forming feature; concealment of tonality; transition to bitonality and polytonality. Change in attitude to dissonance: no more compulsion to resolve dissonant chords. Preference for altered chords; layering of chords (dominant and tonic at the same time) in thirds up to the undecimal; layering of fourths and fifths.
- Rhythm: tendency to veil bars and even to abolish bar patterns; metre becomes unimportant, accents are set freely; frequent bar changes, frequent syncopations.
- Instrumentation: differentiation of colour nuances; search for new sound effects with a preference for blending sounds; shimmering, iridescent, blurring sound surfaces with rich inner movement. Pointillism (setting of sound spots). Preference for harp. Differentiated pedal effects in piano music. In many cases, Arnold Schönberg's idea of a timbre melody is already realised.
- Form: Loosening up and abandoning traditional forms; no rigid formal schemes. Often repetition of a phrase two or more times.

The works that have become famous are:

- Debussy: Prélude à l'après-midi d'un faune for orchestra (1892–94)
- Debussy: Pelléas et Mélisande, lyric drama in five acts and twelve pictures with orchestra after a text by Maurice Maeterlinck (1893–1902)
- Dukas: L'Apprenti sorcier (The Sorcerer's Apprentice) for orchestra (1897)
- Ravel: Pavane pour une infante défunte (for piano 1899; orchestral version 1910)
- Ravel: Jeux d'eau for piano (1901)
- Debussy: Pour le piano (1901–02)
- Debussy: La Mer for orchestra (1903–05)
- Ravel: Daphnis et Chloé, ballet music for orchestra (1909–1912)
- Debussy: Préludes – Livre I (1909–10) and Préludes – Livre II for piano (1910–12)

==== Viennese School: Schönberg – Webern – Berg ====
The so-called Viennese School, considered as such since 1904 and more rarely called the Second or New Viennese School or Viennese Atonal School, refers to the circle of Viennese composers with Arnold Schönberg and his pupils Anton Webern and Alban Berg as its centre. Due to Schönberg's strong appeal as a teacher, who attracted students from many countries, and due to his teaching activities in changing cities, the term transferred from the designation of a 'school' to the style that this school produced. The term is narrowly applied mostly to compositions worked in the twelve-tone technique.

The composers of the Viennese School were, although not exclusively, stylistically influential for the Late Romanticism with the main work Verklärte Nacht Op. 4, a string sextet by Schönberg from 1899. Alongside this is Webern's Piano Quintet (1907), which, however, did not have any impact, as it was not published until 1953. Alban Berg's "Jugendlieder" also belong to this corpus.

The school had a style-defining effect on so-called musical expressionism, which was joined by some – mostly early – works by other composers.

Under the keyword atonality, which refers less to a style than to a compositional technique subsequently designated as such, the Viennese School is "leading the way". The compositional development then leads on to the twelve-tone technique, which also designates a compositional technique and not a style.

It should not be overlooked that Schoenberg and Berg also developed a number of intersections with neoclassicism – mainly on the level of form and less in terms of composition and adopted stylistic elements.

===== Expressionism =====
Expressionism in music was developed in direct contact with the currents of the same name in the visual arts (Die Brücke, Dresden 1905; Der Blaue Reiter, Munich 1909; Galerie Der Sturm, Berlin 1910) and literature (Trakl, Heym, Stramm, Benn, Wildgans, Wedekind, Toller and others) from around 1906. As a style, it was completed around 1925, but the musical characteristics and many of the expressive gestures have endured to the present day.

The main representatives are the composers of the Second Viennese School: Arnold Schönberg, Anton Webern and Alban Berg as well as, against a different background of the history of ideas, Alexander Scriabin.

Composers have sought a subjective immediacy of expression, drawn as directly as possible from the human soul. To achieve this, a break with tradition, with traditional aesthetics and the previous, hackneyed forms of expression was unavoidable.

Stylistically, the changed function of dissonances is particularly striking; they appear on an equal footing with consonances and are no longer resolved – what was also called the "emancipation of dissonance". The tonal system is largely dissolved and expanded into atonality. Musical characteristics include: extreme pitches, extreme dynamic contrasts (from whispering to screaming, from pppp to ffff), jagged melody lines with wide leaps; metrically unbound, free rhythm and novel instrumentation. Form: asymmetrical period structure; rapid succession of contrasting moments; often very short "aphoristic" pieces.

Rudolf Stephan: "Expressionist art, wherever and in whatever form it first appeared, was alienated, fiercely rejected and publicly opposed, but also enthusiastically welcomed by individuals. It had abandoned the traditional ideal of art being 'beautiful' in favour of a (claimed) claim to truth; it was probably not infrequently even deliberately 'ugly'. It was thus the first deliberate 'no-longer-beautiful art'."

Main works:

- Scriabin: The Poem of Ecstasy op. 54 for orchestra (1905–1908)
- Webern: Five movements for string quartet op. 5 (1909)
- Webern: Six Pieces for Large Orchestra Op. 6 (1909)
- Schoenberg: Three Piano Pieces op. 11 (1909)
- Schönberg: Five Pieces for Orchestra op. 16 (1909, revised 1922)
- Schönberg: Erwartung op. 17, monodrama (1909, not performed until 1924)
- Schoenberg: Sechs kleine Klavierstücke op. 19 (1911)
- Webern: Five Pieces for Orchestra op. 10 (1911)
- Schoenberg: Pierrot Lunaire op. 21 for one speaking voice and ensemble (1912)
- Berg: Five orchestral songs after poems by Peter Altenberg op. 4 (1912)
- Stravinsky: The Rite of Spring (1913)
- Berg: Three orchestral pieces op. 6 (1914)
- Scriabin: Vers la flamme, poème op. 72 for piano (1914)
- Webern: Songs for voice and ensembles opp. 14–18 (1917–1925)
- Berg: Wozzeck op. 7, opera (1917–1922, first performance 1925)
- Bartók: The Miraculous Mandarin for orchestra (1918–1923, rev. 1924 and 1926–31)

===== Atonality =====
The term "atonal" appeared in music theory literature around 1900 and from there migrated into music journalistic usage – usually used in a negative, combative manner. It is usually used to describe music with a harmony that does not establish any binding keys or references to a fundamental, i.e. to tonality. "Atonality", although often used in this way, is not a stylistic term, but belongs to the field of compositional techniques; the works written atonally belong predominantly to expressionism. In addition to the main works mentioned there, the following were important, especially for the transitional phase from extended tonality to atonality:

- Schoenberg: Chamber Symphony No. 1 op. 9 (1906).
- Schoenberg: String Quartet No. 2 op. 10 (1907–08), still in the key of F-sharp minor, but already freitonal, especially in the two vocal movements (soprano) "Litanei" and "Entrückung".
- Schoenberg: Das Buch der hängenden Gärten op. 15, 15 poems by Stefan George for one voice and piano. (1908–1909)

=== Rupture through fascism ===
During the National Socialist era, most forms of new music, as well as jazz music, were designated as degenerate and their performance and dissemination banned or suppressed. The exhibition degenerate music on the occasion of the Reichsmusiktage in Düsseldorf in 1938 denounced the work of composers such as Paul Hindemith, Arnold Schönberg, Alban Berg, Kurt Weill and others, as well as all Jewish composers. Instead, in the spirit of the "NS-Kulturpolitik", harmless entertainment and Gebrauchsmusik such as operetta, dance and March music, especially also Folk music, were promoted and included in the propaganda. Numerous composers and musicians were persecuted or murdered by the National Socialists, often because of their Jewish origins. Many went into exile. Those who remained in Germany were partly attributed an "inner exile".

An important source on the position of New Music during the National Socialist era was the annotated reconstruction of the above-mentioned exhibition Degenerate Music, which was first shown in Frankfurt from 1988 onwards, thus gradually beginning a reappraisal of this topic.

=== Institutionalisation and the new musical beginning after 1945 ===
The harsh rejection of New Music by concert audiences, which has gone down in history in a series of spectacular premiere scandals, has significantly promoted the literary discussion of New Music. Thus, first of all, the critics of the relevant journals took up their positions, but composers also found themselves increasingly called upon to comment on their creations or to take up the cause of their colleagues' works. Parallel to this, an increasingly extensive body of musical literature emerged that also sought to describe the philosophical, sociological and historical dimensions of New Music. Another subsequent phenomenon was the creation of specialised forums for the performance of New Music. Schönberg's "Society for Private Musical Performances" (1918) is an early consistent step, which, however, slowly removes "Neue Musik" from the field of vision of the (quantitatively large) concert audience and turns it into a matter of specialists for specialists. The establishment of regular concert events, such as the Donaueschingen Festival and the founding of Internationale Gesellschaft für Neue Musik are a further reaction to the significantly changed sociological situation in which composers of New Music and their audiences found themselves. The caesura in the development of New Music brought about by the catastrophe of the Second World War is attempted to be compensated for by the progressive institutionalisation of musical life after 1945. The conscious new beginnings of the reopened or newly founded music academies attempted to pick up the thread of the interrupted development. The founding of the public broadcasting companies gave composers a new forum for their works, and the awarding of composition commissions additionally stimulated their production.

After the end of the Second World War, the Kranichsteiner Ferienkurse für Neue Musik, organised every two years by the Staatstheater Darmstadt, became the most influential international event for new music in Germany. The dominant compositional techniques there were those of serialism. Anton Webern became the leading figure. Olivier Messiaen, who uses in his works among others musical techniques of non-European musical cultures, but also methods of serial music, is the teacher of some of the composers who cause the most sensation there. Among them are:

- Pierre Boulez (also working as a conductor of "Neue Musik")
- Karlheinz Stockhausen (among others composer of electronic music and active at the Studio for Electronic Music (WDR) in Cologne)
- Luciano Berio
- Mauricio Kagel (experimental music theatre)
- Iannis Xenakis

(Important in this context are also the Institute for New Music and Music Education (INMM) Darmstadt with its annual spring conference and the Darmstadt International Music Institute (IMD), which has an extensive archive of rare recordings, especially of earlier events of the International Summer Courses for New Music. The recordings are available on various media; since at least 1986 also on digital media).

While in the pre-war period the main impulses for the development of New Music came from Central Europe, primarily from the German-speaking countries, and other avant-gardists, for example Charles Ives in the US, received little attention, the development now became increasingly international. Traditionally strong musical countries such as France (with Olivier Messiaen, Pierre Boulez and Iannis Xenakis), Italy (Luciano Berio, Luigi Nono) made important contributions, others such as Poland (Witold Lutosławski, Krzysztof Penderecki) or Switzerland with Heinz Holliger and Jacques Wildberger joined in. In the US, the circle around John Cage and Morton Feldman was significant for Europe. It was not atypical for post-war developments in Germany that the emigrated musicians could contribute little, but rather that the "new generation" (especially Karlheinz Stockhausen) became influential – with considerable support for example from France: as a teacher of Stockhausen and Boulez, Messiaen was a regular guest at the International Summer Courses in Darmstadt. In this sense, music may even have helped in the post-war peace process. Last but not least, some important representatives of New Music found their way from elsewhere to their places of work in Germany, such as György Ligeti from Hungary, Isang Yun from Korea and Mauricio Kagel from Argentina.

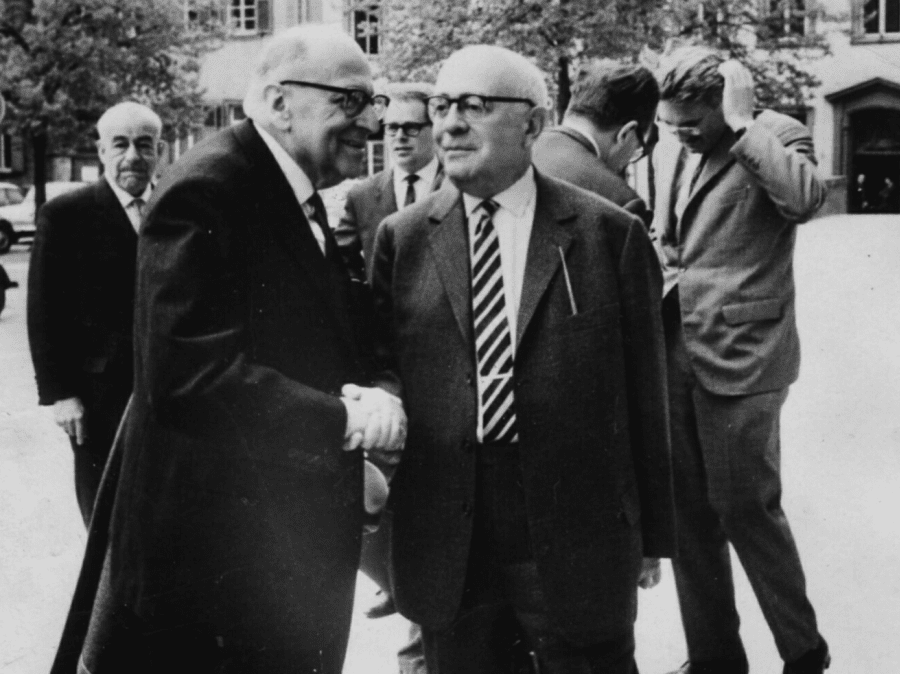
Theodor Adorno (right) with Max Horkheimer

The most important (albeit controversial) theoretician of New Music in the German-speaking world is Theodor W. Adorno (1903–1969), a student of Alban Berg. In his Philosophy of New Music, published in 1949, Adorno argues in favour of Schoenberg's atonal compositional style and contrasts it with Stravinsky's neoclassical style, which was seen as a relapse into already outdated compositional techniques. For Adorno, the atonal revolution around 1910 by Schönberg meant the liberation of music from the constraints of tonality and thus the unhindered development of musical expression qua free atonality with the full impulse life of the sounds. In the German-speaking world, Adorno's thinking was then taken up by others, Heinz-Klaus Metzger among them.

The first turning point was the period around 1950, when the critic Karl Schumann summed up that the economic miracle had also led to a "cultural miracle". From the 1950s onwards, various developments took place, among others:

- Aleatoric music (dice coincidence): John Cage, Earle Brown, "moderate aleatoricism": Witold Lutosławski
- Neo-Dada (from about 1968)
- Expansion of traditional playing techniques: Helmut Lachenmann, Friedrich Goldmann and the young Krzysztof Penderecki
- micropolyphony, timbre music: György Ligeti, Erhard Grosskopf
- Polystylistic, collage: Bernd Alois Zimmermann, Alfred Schnittke, the Sinfonia of Luciano Berio.
- Minimal music in America: among others. Terry Riley; Steve Reich, Philip Glass, John Adams.
- Low-event, meditative and single-sound-oriented music, also mainly in the USA, close in thought to minimal music, but using other compositional principles (no pattern formation): Morton Feldman, George Crumb, in Germany Peter Michael Hamel and Walter Zimmermann.
- in Germany: New Simplicity; among its representatives are. Hans-Jürgen von Bose, Peter Michael Hamel, Wolfgang Rihm, Manfred Trojahn, Detlev Müller-Siemens
- New complexity : continuation of serial and constructive procedures; often emphasis on the performative. Main representatives: Brian Ferneyhough as well as his student Claus-Steffen Mahnkopf
- Spectral music, especially in France: harmony and melody are derived from the acoustics Gérard Grisey was the initiator, and Tristan Murail is a main representative and repeatedly cited model. Another important representative of spectral music is the Austrian Georg Friedrich Haas.
- Conceptual music: Peter Ablinger, Antoine Beuger, Johannes Kreidler, Hannes Seidl, Martin Schüttler, Trond Reinholdtsen, Anton Wassiljew.
- Electroacoustic music: collective term for various conceptions of electronic sound production or transformation:

- Electronic music: music composed with synthetically generated sounds that originated in Cologne and initially emanated from Serialism. Its pioneers include Herbert Eimert, Karlheinz Stockhausen and Gottfried Michael Koenig.
- Musique concrète: Electronic transformation of recorded sounds or noises, representatives include. Pierre Schaeffer, Pierre Henry, Luc Ferrari and Michel Chion
- Acousmatic music: Music produced electronically in the form of sound objects whose means of sound production are not identifiable. The term became widespread mainly through François Bayle and Francis Dhomont.
- Algorithmic composition: composition using computer-generated structures – Jean-Claude Risset, Orm Finnendahl, Hanspeter Kyburz, Enno Poppe. Among the pioneers of this field are the o. g. Gottfried Michael Koenig and Iannis Xenakis.

Another dimension in the case of some composers is the addition of an ideological or political (as a rule, "left-wing") orientation, which is particularly noticeable in vocal compositions. The quasi father of the idea is Hanns Eisler, later Luigi Nono, Hans Werner Henze, Rolf Riehm, Helmut Lachenmann, Nicolaus A. Huber and Mathias Spahlinger.

Especially from the 1970s onwards, a trend towards individualisation sets in, in particular a definitive detachment from serial composing. In the music of our time, one can therefore speak of a stylistic pluralism. In György Ligeti's music for example, musical influences from different cultures and times can be observed. The Italian improviser and composer Giacinto Scelsi, the Englishman Kaikhosru Shapurji Sorabji, the Estonian Arvo Pärt and the Mexican by choice Conlon Nancarrow represent completely independent positions. The American Harry Partch represents a special extreme case: the dissemination of his music was opposed by the fact that it depended on its own microtonal instrumentation.

A fixed classification of composers into currents and "schools" cannot be compelling, since many contemporary composers have dealt with several styles in their lifetime (best example: Igor Stravinsky, who, although treated for decades as the antipode of Schoenberg, switched to the serial technique in his old age). In addition, alongside the respective avant-garde, there is a large number of composers who integrate new techniques more or less partially and selectively into their compositional style, which is determined by tradition, or who attempt a synthesis between the two worlds, which is not quite adequately described by the keyword moderate modernism or "naive modernism", because it is too one-sided.

== Forums ==
- Acht Brücken, Cologne
- Aspekte Salzburg, Salzburg
- chiffren – Kieler Tage für Neue Musik, Kiel
- Donaueschingen Festival, Donaueschingen
- Dresdner Tage der zeitgenössischen Musik, Dresden
- Eclat, Stuttgart
- Ensemble intercontemporain, Paris
- Festival Archipel, Geneva
- Festival L’art pour l’Aar, Bern
- Hallische Musiktage
- Internationale Ferienkurse für Neue Musik, Darmstadt
- Internationale Weingartener Tage für Neue Musik, Weingarten
- ISCM World (New) Music Days
- Klangwerkstatt Berlin
- MaerzMusik, Berlin
- Musicarama, Hongkong
- Randspiele, Zepernick bei Berlin
- Tage für Neue Musik Zürich
- Ultraschall Berlin
- Warsaw Autumn
- Weimarer Frühjahrstage für zeitgenössische Musik, Weimar
- Wien Modern, Wien
- Wittener Tage für neue Kammermusik
- Zeit für Neue Musik, Bayreuth

== Ensembles ==
One of the first ensembles for New Music was the Domaine Musical initiated by Pierre Boulez. In 1976, he founded the Ensemble intercontemporain, on whose model numerous ensembles of new music with similar instrumentation were subsequently formed, such as the Ensemble Modern in Frankfurt, the Klangforum Wien, the musikFabrik NRW, the Asko Ensemble, the London Sinfonietta and the KammarensembleN in Stockholm.

- Alter Ego
- Arditti Quartet
- AuditivVokal Dresden
- Basel Sinfonietta, Basel/CH
- Collegium Novum Zürich, CH
- Contrechamps, Genf/CH
- CQ – Cologne Contemporary Ukulele Ensemble, Cologne (one of the few ukulele orchestras in Germany dedicated to Neue Musik)
- Ensemble Modern, Freiburg
- Ensemble Dal Niente, Chicago/USA
- ensemble für neue musik zürich
- Ensemble Interface, Frankfurt
- Ensemble Modern, Frankfurt
- Ensemble Phoenix, Basel/CH
- Ensemble Phorminx, Darmstadt
- Ensemble Proton Bern, CH
- ensemble recherche, Freiburg
- Ensemble Sortisatio, Leipzig
- Ensemble Vortex, Genf/CH
- Gruppe Neue Musik Hanns Eisler, Leipzig
- Interzone perceptible, Essen
- Kairos Quartet, Berlin
- Klangforum Wien, Vienna
- Kronos Quartet, San Francisco
- Ensemble intercontemporain, Paris
- Le NEC, La Chaux-de-Fonds/CH
- LUX:NM, Berlin
- Ensemble Musikfabrik, Cologne
- Neue Vocalsolisten Stuttgart
- Österreichisches Ensemble für Neue Musik, Salzburg
- Pegnitzschäfer-Klangkonzepte, Nürnberg
- piano possibile, Munich
- Remix Ensemble Casa da Música, Porto

== Organisations and institutions ==
- Centre de documentation de la musique contemporaine (Cdmc), Paris
- Deutsche Gesellschaft für Elektroakustische Musik (DEGEM) – Vereinigung zur Verbreitung und Förderung elektroakustischer Musik
- Forum Zeitgenössischer Musik Leipzig (FZML)
- Gare du Nord (Basel) – Bahnhof für Neue Musik
- Gesellschaft für Neue Musik (GNM) – deutsche Sektion der IGNM bzw. ISCM
- IGNM-Sektion Österreich
- Institut für Computermusik und Elektronische Medien (ICEM)
- Institut für kulturelle Innovationsforschung – new classical e. V. (IKI)
- Institut für Neue Musik und Musikerziehung (INMM), Darmstadt
- International Society for Contemporary Music (IGNM) bzw. International Society for Contemporary Music (ISCM) – organisiert die von Mitgliedsland zu Mitgliedsland jährlich wechselnden Weltmusiktage
- Internationales Musikinstitut Darmstadt (IMD), Darmstadt
- IRCAM, Paris/F
- Netzwerk Neue Musik
- Sächsischer Musikbund
- Schweizerische Gesellschaft für Neue Musik (SGNM)
- Gesellschaft für Zeitgenössische Musik Aachen (GZM)

== Journals ==
- Musikblätter des Anbruch
- Dissonance. Schweizer Musikzeitschrift für Forschung und Kreation (Published in a bilingual version: German and French, discontinued in 2018)
- KunstMusik. Schriften zur Musik als Kunst
- MusikTexte. Zeitschrift für neue Musik
- nmz Neue Musikzeitung
- Neue Zeitschrift für Musik
- Positionen. Texte zur aktuellen Musik
- Seiltanz. Beiträge zur Musik der Gegenwart

== See also ==
- Computer music
- Contemporary classical music
- Electroacoustic music
- Electronic music
- Microtonality
- Postmodern music
- Sound art
