= Ivan Clustine =

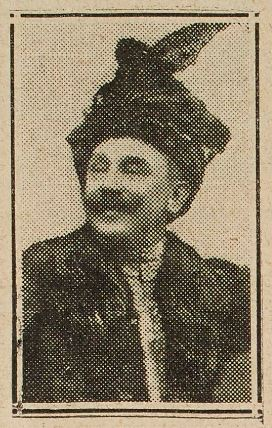
- Born: Иванъ Николаевичъ Хлюстинъ; 22 August 1862; Moscow, Russia
- Died: 21 November 1941 (aged 79); Nice, France
- Occupations: Dancer, ballet master, choreographer

Ivan Nikolayevich Khlyustin (Russian: Иван Николаевич Хлюстин; (Note: Иванъ Николаевичъ Хлюстинъ in Russian pre-revolutionary script.) 22 August [O.S. 10 August] 1862 – 21 November 1941), usually referred to outside Russia as Ivan Clustine, was a Russian dancer, ballet master, and choreographer. He was "offered the position of ballet master and teacher at the Paris Opera, where he served from 1909 to 1914." He was then intermittently ballet master of Anna Pavlova's company until her death. Among his choreographies were La Péri (1912), Philotis, and Hansli le Bossu (1914).
