= Kairos Quartet =

German string quartet

The Kairos Quartet is a Berlin-based string quartet founded in 1996.

== History ==
The Kairos Quartet (initially "work in progress quartet") specialises in music from 1950 onwards. At the time of its foundation in 1996 it was the first string quartet with such an orientation in the German-speaking world. It is named after Kairos, in Greek mythology the god of the favourable moment and the embodiment of the subjective concept of time. The quartet made its debut at the Darmstädter Ferienkurse in Darmstadt in 1996, where it was also taught by the primarius of the Arditti Quartet.

It has since collaborated with many composers, including Georg Friedrich Haas, György Kurtág, Helmut Lachenmann, Liza Lim, Sergej Newski, Enno Poppe, Wolfgang Rihm and Marco Stroppa. The Kairos Quartet frequently performs at Neue Musik festivals in Europe and Mexico. In 2018, the quartet made its debut in China with a concert and several workshops at the Shanghai Conservatory of Music. Subsequently the quartet also went to Guangzhou and Kuala Lumpur (Malaysia, performed Unsuk Chin's string quartet at Elbphilharmonie Hamburg and had its first performance in Rome. Its repertoire now includes nearly 300 compositions, including around 100 premieres and commissioned works.

The Kairos Quartet is also actively involved in teaching Neue Musik, among others at the Zurich University of the Arts, the National Autonomous University of Mexico, the Universität Mozarteum Salzburg, the Shanghai Conservatory, the Xinghai Conservatory in Guangzhou, and the Berlin University of the Arts. It sets its own accents through self-organised concerts, alternative concert formats and concert series.

== Members ==
- Rui Cardoso Antunes, violin (9/2022-2023: Delia Ramos Rodrigues, 1/2022-8/2022: Veronika Paleeva, 9/2021–12/2021: Daniella Strasfogel, 1996-2021: Wolfgang Bender)
- Alexa Renger, violin (1/2022-8/2022: Alicja Pilarczyk, 2008–2021: Stefan Häussler, 6/2007–5/2008: Susanne Zapf, 1997–2007: Chatschatur Kanajan, 1996–1997: Kathrein Allenberg)
- Simone Heilgendorff, viola
- Claudius von Wrochem, violoncello

The violins alternate in the function of the first violin.

== Prizes and scholarships ==
- Kranichstein Scholarship
- German Record Critics' Prize 1/2005.
- Composition commissions from the Berlin Senate.
- Concerts of the German Music Council
- Scholarship holder of the Akademie Schloss Solitude 2000/2001 (as first ensemble)
- Sponsorship awards from the Ernst von Siemens Foundation
- Project funding by the Hauptstadtkulturfonds
- Project funding by the Foundation Deutsche Klassenlotterie Berlin
- Ensemble funding by the Senate of Berlin
- Ensemble funding by Deutsche Musikrat: NEUSTART for ensembles and bands

== Recordings ==
- Portrait of the Kairos Quartet at Edition Zeitklang
- Georg Friedrich Haas: String Quartets 1 and 2 at Edition Zeitklang
- Portrait of the composer Viera Janarcekova at ProViva
- Portrait of the composer Enno Poppe at col legno
- "Wider den Strich" (Musik in Deutschland 1950-2000 among others Orm Finnendahl Fälschung for string quartet, laptop, ghetto blaster and live electronics (2003) at Red Seal
- Composer portrait Jay Schwartz at Wergo (German Music Council).
- Composer portrait Knut Müller: "Chamber Music" with Thorn [1996] (1st string quartet, recording from 2001, EZ), Zeug [1999] (2nd string quartet)2012 Edition Zeitklang
- "Klangnarbe" - composer portrait Marina Khorkova a. a. String Quartet No. 1 at Wergo (German Music Council).
- mientras" Schönberg String Quartet No. 2 and Sabine Panzer mientras with Angelika Luz (soprano) at Edition Zeitklang - www.zeitklang.de
- Recordings and productions on most German broadcasters as well as ORF, RAI, DRS and the BBC.
