= Paul Dukas =

French composer (1865–1935)

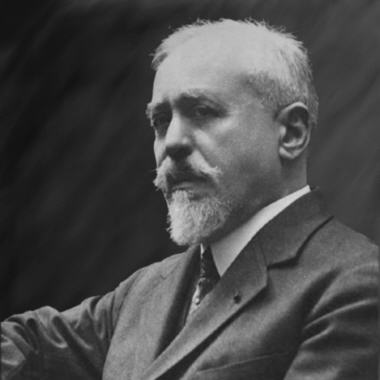
- Born: 1 October 1865; Paris, France
- Died: 17 May 1935 (aged 69); Paris, France
- Resting place: Columbarium at Père Lachaise Cemetery

Signature
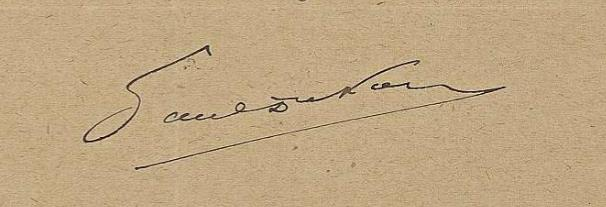

Paul Abraham Dukas (French: [dykɑ(ː)s] 1 October 1865 – 17 May 1935) was a French composer, critic, scholar and teacher. A studious man of retiring personality, he was intensely self-critical and abandoned and destroyed many of his compositions. His best-known work is the orchestral piece The Sorcerer's Apprentice (L'apprenti sorcier), the fame of which has eclipsed that of his other surviving works, largely due to its usage in the 1940 Disney film Fantasia. Among these are the opera Ariane et Barbe-bleue, his Symphony in C and Piano Sonata, the Variations, Interlude and Finale on a Theme by Rameau (for solo piano), and a ballet, La Péri.

At a time when French musicians were divided into conservative and progressive factions, Dukas adhered to neither but retained the admiration of both. His compositions were influenced by composers including Beethoven, Berlioz, Franck, d'Indy and Debussy.

In tandem with his composing career, Dukas worked as a music critic, contributing regular reviews to at least five French journals. Later in his life he was appointed professor of composition at the Conservatoire de Paris and the École normale de musique de Paris; his pupils included Maurice Duruflé, Olivier Messiaen, Walter Piston, Manuel Ponce, Joaquín Rodrigo and Xian Xinghai.

== Life and career ==
=== Early years ===
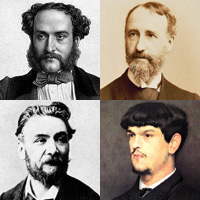
Dukas's teachers, Georges Mathias (top l.), Théodore Dubois (top r.) and Ernest Guiraud (bottom l.), and Dukas's fellow student Claude Debussy

Dukas was born in Paris, the second son in a Jewish family of three children. His father, Jules Dukas, was a banker, and his mother, Eugénie, was a capable pianist. When Dukas was five years old, his mother died giving birth to her third child, Marguerite-Lucie. Dukas took piano lessons but showed no unusual musical talent until he was 14 when he began to compose while recovering from an illness. He entered the Conservatoire de Paris at the end of 1881, aged 16, and studied piano with Georges Mathias, harmony with Théodore Dubois and composition with Ernest Guiraud. Among his fellow students was Claude Debussy, with whom Dukas formed a close friendship. Two early overtures survive from this period, Goetz de Berlichingen (1883) and Le Roi Lear (1883). The manuscript of the latter was rediscovered in the 1990s and the work was performed for the first time in 1995.

Dukas won several prizes, including the second place in the Conservatoire's most prestigious award, the Prix de Rome, for his cantata Velléda in 1888. Disappointed at his failure to win the top prize, he left the Conservatoire in 1889. After compulsory military service he began a dual career as a composer and a music critic.

=== 1890s ===
Dukas's career as a critic began in 1892 with a review of Wagner's Der Ring des Nibelungen conducted by Gustav Mahler at Covent Garden in London. His review was published in La Revue Hebdomadaire; he later wrote also for Minerva, La Chronique des Arts, Gazette des Beaux-Arts and Le Courrier Musical. His Parisian debut as composer was a performance of his overture Polyeucte, written in 1891 and premiered by Charles Lamoureux and his Orchestre Lamoureux in January 1892. Based on a tragedy by Corneille, the work, like many French works of the period, shows the influence of Wagner, but is coherent and displays some individuality.

Gazette des Beaux-Arts, for which Dukas wrote music criticism

Although Dukas wrote a fair amount of music, he was a perfectionist and destroyed many of his pieces out of dissatisfaction with them. Only a few of his compositions remain. After Polyeucte, he began writing an opera in 1892. He wrote his own libretto, Horn et Riemenhild, but he composed only one act, "realising too late that the work's developments were more literary than musical".

The Symphony in C major was composed in 1895–96, when Dukas was in his early 30s. It is dedicated to Paul Vidal, and had its first performance in January 1896, under the direction of the dedicatee. In a study of Dukas published towards the end of the composer's life, Irving Schwerké wrote, "The work … is an opulent expression of modernism in classical form. Its ideational luxuriance, nobility of utterance and architectural solidity mark it as one of the most conspicuous achievements of contemporaneous writing, and magnificently refute the generally prevalent notion that no French composer has ever produced a great symphony." Like Franck's only symphony, Dukas's is in three movements rather than the conventional four. Schwerké wrote of it:

Expressed in an individual and spontaneous idiom, the Symphony in C gives free play to the author's creative spirit and to his fund of exalted emotion. The high-spirited, impetuous first movement, Allegro non troppo vivace is intensely rhythmic. Its logical structure, strong thematic material, polyphonic richness and virile instrumentation combine to create an exhilarating effect of life and pageant color. The second movement, Andante, in sharp contrast to the first, reveals the perfect finish of the composer's style and the ineffable charm of his melody. The robust last movement, Allegro spiritoso, so verdant in instrumentation, brings the symphony to a vigorous close.

The work received a mixed reception at its first performance. Désiré-Émile Inghelbrecht, later known as a conductor, was a member of the orchestra at the premiere, and wrote, "the work which nowadays seems to us so lucid aroused not only the protestations of the public, but also those of the musicians of the orchestra." The symphony was better received when the Lamoureux Orchestra revived it in 1902.

The symphony was followed by another orchestral work, by far the best known of Dukas's compositions, his scherzo for orchestra, L'apprenti sorcier (The Sorcerer's Apprentice) (1897), a short piece (lasting for between 10 and 12 minutes in performance) based on Goethe's poem "Der Zauberlehrling". During Dukas's lifetime The Musical Quarterly commented that the world fame of the work not only overshadowed all other compositions by Dukas, but also eclipsed Goethe's original poem. The popularity of the piece became a matter of irritation to Dukas. In 2011, the Grove Dictionary of Music and Musicians observed, "The popularity of L'apprenti sorcier and the exhilarating film version of it in Disney's Fantasia possibly hindered a fuller understanding of Dukas, as that single work is far better known than its composer."

=== 20th-century works ===
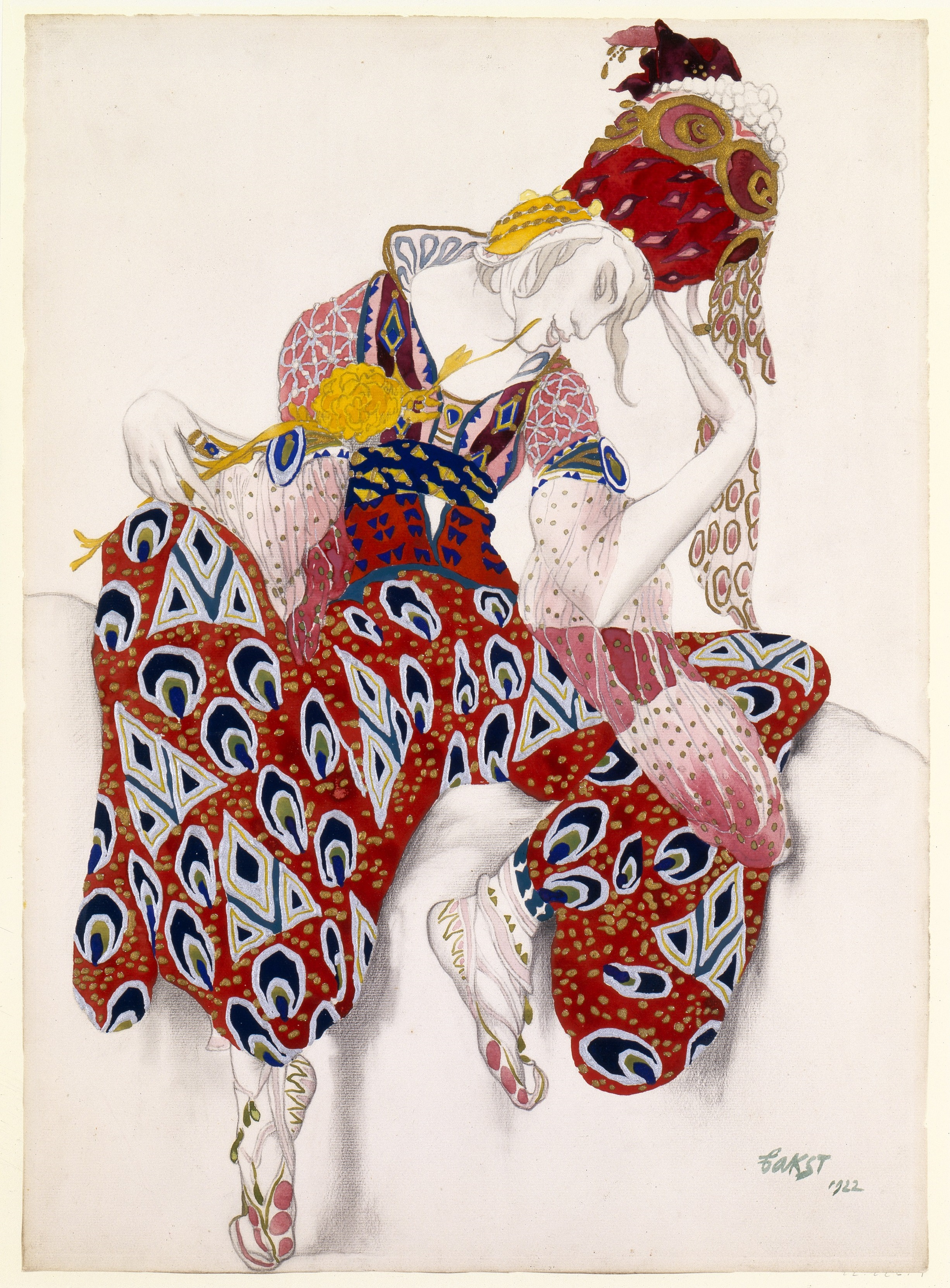
Costume design for Dukas's La Péri by Léon Bakst, 1922

In the decade after L'apprenti sorcier, Dukas completed two complex and technically demanding large-scale works for solo piano: the Piano Sonata (1901), dedicated to Saint-Saëns, and Variations, Interlude and Finale on a Theme by Rameau (1902). In Dukas's piano works critics have discerned the influence of Beethoven, or, "Beethoven as he was interpreted to the French mind by César Franck". Both works were premiered by Édouard Risler, a celebrated pianist of the era. There are also two smaller works for piano solo. The Sonata, described by the critic Edward Lockspeiser as "huge and somewhat recondite", did not enter the mainstream repertoire, but it has been more recently championed by such pianists as Marc-André Hamelin and Margaret Fingerhut. Lockspeiser describes the Rameau Variations as more developed and assured ... Dukas infuses the conventional form with a new and powerful spirit."

In 1899 Dukas turned once again to operatic composition. His second attempt, L'arbre de science, was abandoned, incomplete, but in the same year he began work on his one completed opera, Ariane et Barbe-bleue (Ariadne and Bluebeard). The work is a setting of a libretto by Maurice Maeterlinck. The author had intended the libretto to be set by Grieg but in 1899 he offered it to Dukas. Dukas worked on it for seven years and it was produced at the Opéra-Comique in 1907. The opera has often been compared to Debussy's Pelléas et Mélisande which was first performed while Dukas was writing Ariane et Barbe-bleue. Not only are both works settings of Maeterlinck, but there are musical similarities; Dukas even quotes from the Debussy work in his score. Although it won considerable praise, its success was overshadowed by the Paris premiere of Richard Strauss's sensational opera Salome at much the same time. Nonetheless, within a short time of its premiere, Dukas's opera was produced in Vienna, where it aroused much interest in Schoenberg's circle, and in Frankfurt, Milan and New York. It did not maintain a regular place in the repertory, despite the advocacy of Arturo Toscanini, who conducted it in New York three years in succession, and Sir Thomas Beecham, who pronounced it "one of the finest lyrical dramas of our time", and staged it at Covent Garden in 1937. Interest in it revived in the 1990s, with productions in Paris (Théâtre du Châtelet, 1990) and Hamburg (Staatsoper, 1997), and at the Opéra Bastille in Paris in 2007.

Dukas's last major work was the sumptuous oriental ballet La Péri (1912). Described by the composer as a "poème dansé" it depicts a young Persian prince who travels to the ends of the Earth in a quest to find the lotus flower of immortality, coming across its guardian, the Péri (fairy). Because of the very quiet opening pages of the ballet score, the composer added a brief "Fanfare pour précéder La Peri" which gave the typically noisy audiences of the day time to settle in their seats before the work proper began. La Péri was written for the Russian-French dancer Natalia Trouhanova, who starred in the first performance at the Châtelet in 1912. Diaghilev planned a production with his Ballets Russes but the production did not take place; the company's choreographer Fokine staged L'apprenti sorcier as a ballet in 1916.

In 1916, Dukas married Suzanne Pereyra (1883–1947), who was of Portuguese descent. They had one child, a daughter Adrienne-Thérèse, born in December 1919.

=== Later years ===
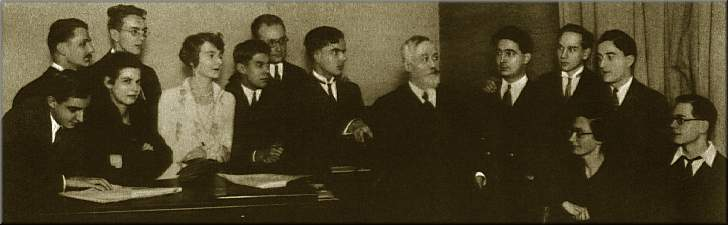
Paul Dukas and students of his composition class at the Paris Conservatoire, 1929. Olivier Messiaen is on the extreme right; Maurice Duruflé stands next to him

In the last years of his life, Dukas became well known as a teacher of composition. When Charles-Marie Widor retired as professor of composition at the Paris Conservatoire in 1927, Dukas was appointed in his place. He also taught at the École normale de musique in Paris. His many students included Jehan Alain, Elsa Barraine, Yvonne Desportes, Francis Chagrin, Carlos Chávez, Maurice Duruflé, Georges Hugon, Jean Langlais, Olivier Messiaen, Walter Piston, Manuel Ponce, Joaquín Rodrigo, David Van Vactor and Xian Xinghai. As a teacher he was conservative but always encouraging of talent, telling one student, "It's obvious that you really love music. Always remember that it should be written from the heart and not with the head." He said his method of teaching was "to help young musicians to express themselves in accordance with their own natures. Music necessarily has to express something; it is also obliged to express somebody, namely, its composer." Grove observes that his wide knowledge of the history of European music, and his editorial work on Rameau, Scarlatti and Beethoven, gave him "particular authority in teaching historical styles".

After La Péri, Dukas completed no new large-scale compositions, although, as with his contemporary Jean Sibelius, there were frequent reports of major work in hand. After several years of silence, in 1920 he produced a tribute to his friend Debussy in the form of La plainte, au loin, du faune... for piano, which was followed by Amours, a setting of a sonnet by Pierre de Ronsard, for voice and piano, published in 1924 to mark the four hundredth anniversary of the poet's birth. Shortly before his death he had been working on a symphonic poem inspired by Shakespeare's The Tempest, a play of which he had made a French translation in 1918 with an operatic version in mind.

In the last year of his life Dukas was elected to membership of the Académie des Beaux-Arts. Though adhering to neither the progressive nor conservative factions among French musicians of the era, Dukas had the friendship and respect of both. In 1920, Vincent d'Indy published a study of Dukas's music; Debussy remained a lifelong friend, though feeling that Dukas's music was not French enough; Saint-Saëns worked with Dukas to complete an unfinished opera by Guiraud, and they were both engaged in the rediscovery and editing of the works of Jean-Philippe Rameau; Fauré dedicated his Piano Quintet No. 2 to Dukas in 1921.

In 1920, he became a member of the Royal Academy of Science, Letters and Fine Arts of Belgium.

Dukas died in Paris in 1935, aged 69. He was cremated and his ashes were placed in the columbarium at Père Lachaise Cemetery in Paris.

== List of works ==
=== Published by the composer ===
- Polyeucte, overture for orchestra (1891)
- Symphony in C (1895–96)
- The Sorcerer's Apprentice, for orchestra (1897)
- Piano Sonata (1899–1900)
- Variations, Interlude and Finale on a Theme by Rameau, for piano (c.1899–1902)
- Ariane et Barbe-bleue, opera (1899–1907)
- Villanelle, for horn and piano (1906)
- Prélude élégiaque sur le nom de Haydn, for piano (1909)
- Vocalise-étude (alla gitana), for voice and piano (1909)
- La Péri, ballet (poème dansé) (1911; later supplemented with Fanfare pour précéder La Péri (1912))
- La plainte, au loin, du faune..., for piano (1920)
- Amours, sonnet for voice and piano (1924)
- Allegro, for piano (1925; published posthumously in 2022)

=== Early unpublished works ===
- Air de Clytemnestre, for voice and small orchestra (1882)
- Goetz de Berlichingen, overture for orchestra (1883)
- Le roi Lear, overture for orchestra (1883)
- Chanson de Barberine, for soprano and orchestra (1884)
- La fête des Myrthes, for choir and orchestra (1884)
- L'ondine et le pêcheur, for soprano and orchestra (1884)
- Endymion, cantata for three solo voices and orchestra (1885)
- Introduction au poème "Les Caresses", for piano (1885)
- La vision de Saül, cantata for three solo voices and orchestra (1886)
- La fleur, for choir and orchestra (1887)
- Fugue, for four voices in open instrumentation (1888)
- Hymne au soleil, for choir and orchestra (1888)
- Velléda, cantata for three solo voices and orchestra (1888)
- Sémélé, cantata for three solo voices and orchestra (1889)

=== Destroyed and projected works ===
- Horn et Riemenhild, opera (1892)
- L'arbre de science, opera (1899)
- Le fil de parque, symphonic poem (c.1908)
- Le nouveau monde, opera (c.1908–1910)
- Le sang de Méduse, ballet (1912)
- Symphony No. 2 (after 1912)
- Violin Sonata (after 1912)
- La tempête, opera (c.1918)
- Variations choréographiques, ballet (1930)
- An untitled orchestral work for the Boston Symphony Orchestra (1932)
