= Édouard Risler =

French pianist (1873–1929)

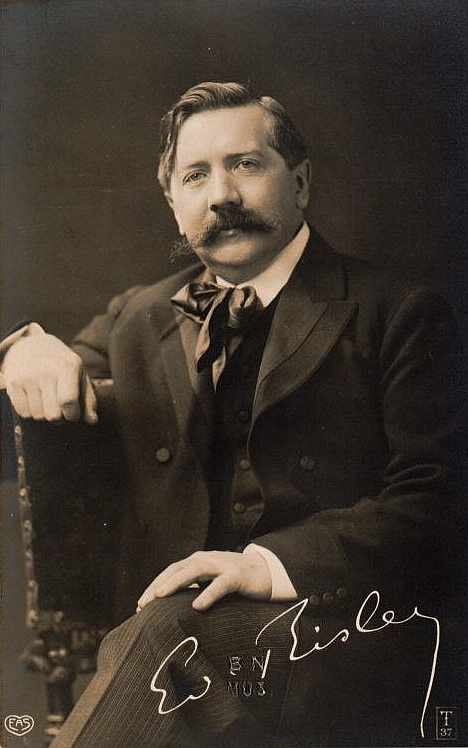
Édouard Risler.

Joseph-Édouard Risler (23 February 1873 – 22 July 1929) was a French pianist.

== Biography ==
Risler was born in Baden-Baden (Germany) of a German mother and an Alsatian father. He studied under Louis Diémer, Théodore Dubois and Émile Decombes at the Conservatoire de Paris from 1883 to 1890. He was recorded by Theo Wangemann at the 1889 Paris Expo, one of the first musical recordings. In 1891 he became a good friend of Emmanuel Chabrier and visited and corresponded with the older composer. He then completed his studies in Germany with Klindworth, d'Albert and Stavenhagen. He was the répétiteur at the Festpielhaus, Bayreuth in 1896.

He soon made a mark on the music world as one of the important French pianists of his time, open to the music of his time as well as the romantic German repertoire. He gave several major cycles: the 32 sonatas of Ludwig van Beethoven from October to December 1905, at the Salle Pleyel, the complete works of Frédéric Chopin and The Well-Tempered Clavier of Johann Sebastian Bach.

From 1906, Risler devoted much time to teaching and became professor at the Paris Conservatoire in 1923. He married Émilie Girette, an amateur singer for whom Gabriel Fauré had written several of his songs. He corresponded regularly with Reynaldo Hahn, and played in the première of the Sonatine in C major of Hahn in April 1908, at the Salle Érard. He died in Paris in 1929.

Emmanuel Chabrier dedicated his Bourrée fantasque to him, (Note: Risler made an arrangement of the piece for two pianos, four hands, premiered by him and Cortot on 11 May 1911.) and Enrique Granados the Coloquio en la reja, extract of Goyescas.

Risler made a piano transcription of Richard Strauss's Till Eulenspiegel's Merry Pranks. (Note: A live recording by Francesco Libetta, given on 26 July 2002 at the International Piano Festival de La Roque-d'Anthéron, was issued on VAI DVD 4375.)

== Premieres given by Risler ==
Risler premiered the following works:

- Ernest Chausson: Quelques danses (1897)
- Emmanuel Chabrier: Ronde champêtre, Ballabile, Feuillet d'album (3 April 1897)
- Paul Dukas : Sonate in E flat minor (Salle Pleyel, 10 May 1901)
- Dukas: Variations, interlude et finale sur un thème de Rameau (23 May 1903)
- Georges Enesco: Variations pour 2 pianos (with Alfred Cortot)
- Gabriel Fauré: Dolly (Fauré) (with Alfred Cortot; 1898); Impromptu No. 4 (1907); Barcarolles Nos. 6 and 8 (the latter 1907)
- Albéric Magnard: Promenades (Concerts Durand 1911).

== Discography of Risler ==
Risler's recordings consist of only 18 sides produced in 1917 by Pathé, which were released in full by Marston Records in 2007 as "Édouard Risler: Pathé Paper-Label Discs, Paris 1917". They were also released in full by the Symposium label in 2002 and (at least in the most part) by The Piano Library in 1999.

- Ludwig van Beethoven
  - Sonata in A♭, Op. 26: Finale - Allegro
  - Sonata in E♭, Op. 31, No. 3: Second Movement - Scherzo
  - Concerto No. 4 in G, Op. 58: Second Movement - Andante con moto (solo piano transcription by Risler)
- Emmanuel Chabrier
  - Idylle (No. 6 from Pièces pittoresques)
- Frédéric Chopin
  - Etude in G♭, Op. 10, No. 5
  - Nocturne in F♯, Op. 15, No. 2
  - Mazurka in A minor, Op. 17, No. 4
  - Waltz in C♯ minor, Op. 64, No. 2
- François Couperin
  - Le tic-toc-choc, ou Les maillotins
- Louis-Claude Daquin
  - Le coucou
- Benjamin Godard
  - Deuxième Mazurka, Op. 54
- Enrique Granados
  - Spanish Dance No. 10 in G
- Franz Liszt
  - Hungarian Rhapsody No. 11 in A minor
- Felix Mendelssohn
  - Scherzo in E minor, Op. 16, No. 2
- Jean-Philippe Rameau
  - Le rappel des oiseaux
  - Le tambourin
- Camille Saint-Saëns
  - Valse nonchalante in D♭, Op. 110
- Carl Maria von Weber
  - Invitation to the Dance, Op. 65

== Notes and references ==
Notes
