= Edward Lockspeiser =

British composer and musicologist (1905–1973)

Edward Lockspeiser (21 May 1905 – 3 Feb 1973) was an English musicologist, composer, art critic and radio broadcaster on music who specialized in the works and life of French composer Claude Debussy and was considered one of the few British authorities on French classical music.

== Life and career ==
Born on 21 May 1905, Lockspeiser studied at the Paris Conservatory between 1922 and 1926 with Alexandre Tansman and Nadia Boulanger and at the Royal College of Music in London from 1929 to 1930 with Charles Herbert Kitson and Malcolm Sargent. He was voted into the Académie des Beaux-Arts in 1948 for his services to French music.

Lockspeiser's extensive writings on Debussy include a two-volume biography, Debussy: His Life and Mind (1962, 1965), which was the culmination of 30 years of intense research into the composer's life and personality. According to Mark DeVoto of The Boston Musical Intelligencer, this tome "remains a landmark work of biography enriched by a wide-ranging analysis of Debussy’s cultural background and literary and artistic influences." He contributed the entry on Debussy in The New Grove Dictionary of Music and Musicians, articles on Debussy, Felix Mendelssohn and Sergei Diaghilev to the Encyclopædia Britannica and numerous articles for Gramophone, Music & Letters, The Listener and The Musical Times. He was a guest lecturer in the University of London between 1966 and 1971; afterwards, he served in the same capacity in the Collège de France.

Lockspeiser became London music critic for the Yorkshire Post in 1936; before that he concentrated on composition and conducting, founding the Toynbee Hall Orchestra in 1934. He worked with the British Broadcasting Corporation (BBC) from 1941 to 1950. Among the works the BBC commissioned during his tenure was the Sinfonietta from French composer Francis Poulenc. After he left the BBC, Lockspeiser focused on teaching and music journalism. In his teaching, Lockspeiser stressed the importance of understanding a composer's social and aesthetic background to gain a thorough understanding of his musical works. In his last work, he extended this principle to include the visual arts that may have influenced the composer.

Lockspeiser's commitment to music and the visual arts was absolute; his wife Eleanore is quoted as saying that "art was the only important thing in our household" and their daughter, sculptor Mary Frank, has stated that she "was brought up to be an artist." While he wrote some film music later in his career, the majority of Lockspeiser's musical compositions date from the 1920s. Only one work was published (Deux mélodies, Paris, 1926). Lockspeiser's personal library, which was extensive, was acquired after his death by Lancaster University.

== Books ==
- Debussy: his life and mind: Volume 1
- Debussy: his life and mind: Volume 2
- Music and painting: a study in comparative ideas from Turner to Schoenberg
- Debussy: The Master Musicians
- A new history of music: the Middle Ages to Mozart
- The literary clef: an anthology of letters and writings by French ...
- French art and music since 1500: with ill (with Anthony Blunt)
- Berlioz
- Bizet
- Debussy et Edgar Poe:

== Bibliography ==
In English

- Anonymous, "Edward Lockspeiser." In Encyclopædia Britannica. Accessed 27 Mar 2012.
- Anonymous, "Lockspeiser, Edward." On operas.com. Accessed 27 Mar 2012.
- DeVoto, Mark, "Why Debussy Is France's Greatest Composer." In The Boston Musical Intelligencer, 5 Mar 2012. Accessed 27 Mar 2012.
- Biographical preface to Lockspeiser, Edward, "A Survey of Some Recent Recordings." In Gramophone Magazine, Nov 1955. Accessed 27 Mar 2012.
- Meeker, Carlene, "Mary Frank." In Jewish Women Encyclopedia. Accessed 27 Mar 2012.
- Schmidt, Carl B., Entrancing Muse: a documented biography of Francis Poulenc (Lives in Music Series) (Hillsdale, NY: Pendragon Press, 2001). ISBN 1-57647-026-1.

In French

- Anonymous, "Edward Lockspeiser." In Larousse Encyclopedia. Accessed 27 Mar 2012.
