= The Sorcerer's Apprentice (Dukas) =

1897 symphonic poem by Paul Dukas

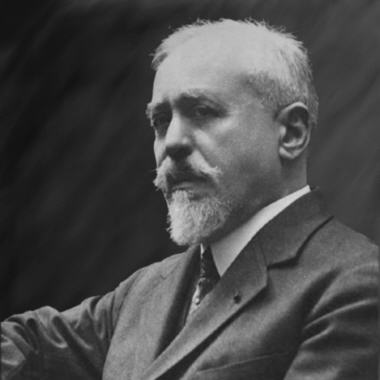
Composer Paul Dukas

The Sorcerer's Apprentice (French: L'Apprenti sorcier) is a symphonic poem by the French composer Paul Dukas, completed in 1897. Subtitled "Scherzo after a ballad by Goethe", the piece is based on Johann Wolfgang von Goethe's 1797 poem named "Der Zauberlehrling". By far the most performed and recorded of Dukas' works, its notable appearance in the Walt Disney 1940 animated film Fantasia has led to the piece becoming widely known to audiences outside the classical concert hall.

The score was first published in 1897 by A. Durand & Fils. The premiere was given in Paris on May 18, 1897 by the Societe Nationale de Musique with the composer himself conducting.

== Analysis ==
=== Description ===
Inspired by the Goethe poem, Dukas's work is part of the larger Romantic genre of programme music, which composers like Franz Liszt, Claude Debussy, Jean Sibelius and Richard Strauss increasingly explored as an alternative to earlier symphonic forms. Unlike other tone poems, such as La mer by Debussy or Finlandia by Sibelius, Dukas's work is, like works such as Till Eulenspiegel's Merry Pranks by Strauss, descriptively programmatic, closely following the events described in the Goethe poem. It was customary, in fact, to publish the poem as part of the orchestral score.

=== Instrumentation ===
The instrumentation of the piece consists of two flutes and piccolo, two oboes, two soprano clarinets and bass clarinet, three bassoons and contrabassoon (or contrabass sarrusophone), four horns, two trumpets (in C), two cornets, three trombones, timpani, glockenspiel, bass drum, cymbals, triangle, harp and strings. The formidable glockenspiel part is sometimes handled by a pianist playing a keyboard glockenspiel or celesta, but is usually played by a percussionist on a traditional glockenspiel making it a common orchestral excerpt for percussion auditions. Dukas also made a transcription for two pianos of this orchestral piece.

== In film ==
Although The Sorcerer's Apprentice was already a popular concert piece, it was brought to a much larger audience through its inclusion, as one of eight animated shorts based on classical music, in the 1940 Walt Disney animated concert film Fantasia. In the film segment, also called “The Sorcerer’s Apprentice,” Mickey Mouse plays the role of the apprentice. Disney had acquired the music rights in 1937 when he planned to release a separate Mickey Mouse film which, at the suggestion of Leopold Stokowski, was eventually expanded into Fantasia. It was reproduced in Fantasia 2000 as the only segment from the original film to be used in the movie as it uses seven new segments conducted by Stokowski's successor James Levine.

In 1930, a decade prior to Fantasia, Sidney Levee directed, Hugo Riesenfeld and William Cameron Menzies produced, and Joseph M. Schenck presented a series of four short films of classical music. One of the four, based on the Dukas music, was titled The Wizard's Apprentice; this short film has been released on DVD and shown on Classic Arts Showcase. In 1931, the Dukas piece was used in Study No. 8 by Oskar Fischinger.
