= List of compositions by Anton Webern =

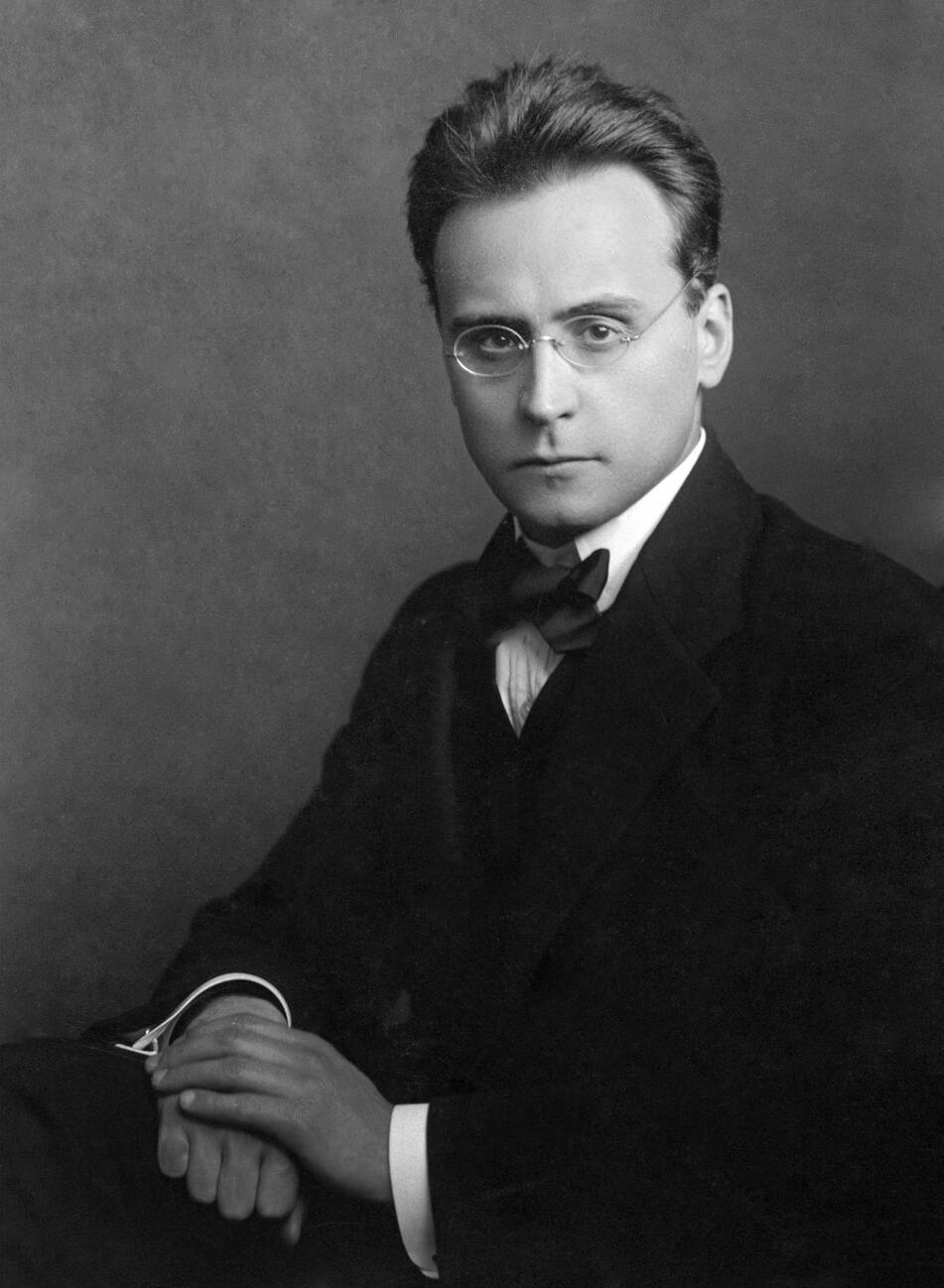
Anton Webern in Stettin, October 1912

The Austrian composer Anton Webern (1883–1945) left a relatively small output of compositions. Many of his works are without opus numbers, and many were published posthumously.

== List of compositions ==
* – Posthumous publishing date

List of compositions by Anton Webern (Note: For a complete list of unpublished compositions and sketches, see Moldenhauer & Moldenhauer 1978, pp. 700–705)
Title	Year(s)		Op.	Genre	Text	Ref(s)
Title	Comp.	Publ.	Op.	Genre	Text	Ref(s)
=== Orchestral works ===
Im Sommerwind ("In the Summer Wind")	1904	1966*	–	Orchestral	None	
Three Studies on a Bass Ostinato	1907	unpubd.	–	Orchestral	None	
Passacaglia	1908	1922	Op. 1	Orchestral	None	
Sechs Stücke ("Six Pieces")	1909; 1928 (rev.)	1913; 1956 (rev.)	Op. 6	Orchestral	None	
Fünf Stücke ("Five Pieces")	1911–13	1923	Op. 10	Orchestral	None	
Eight Fragments	1911–13	unpubd.	–	Orchestral	None	
Orchestral Pieces	1913	1971*	–	Orchestral	None	
Symphony	1927–28	1929	Op. 21	Orchestral	None	
Variations	1940	1956*	Op. 30	Orchestral	None	
=== Choral ===
Entflieht auf leichten Kähnen ("Escape using Light Boats")	1908	1921	Op. 2	Choir (SATB, acapella)	S. George	
Zwei Lieder ("Two Songs"): 1. "Weiss wie Lilien" ("White like Lilies"); 2. "Ziehn die Schafe" ("When the Sheep")	1925–26	1928	Op. 19	Choir (SATB), chamber orchestra	J.W. von Goethe	
Das Augenlicht "The Eyes' Radiance"	1935	1956*	Op. 26	Choir (SATB), orchestra	H. Jone	
Cantata No. 1: 1. "Zündender Lichtblitz" ("Firing Flash of Light"); 2. "Kleiner Flügel" ("Small Wing"); 3. "Tönen die seligen Saiten Apolls" ("Hearing the Blessed Strings of the Sun God")	1938–39 orch. 1944	1954*	Op. 29	Choir (SATB), soloist, orchestra	H. Jone	
Cantata No. 2: 1. "Schweigt auch die Welt" ("The World is Silent too"); 2. "Sehr tiefverhalte" ("Very Deep"); 3. "Schöpfen aus Brunnen" ("Scooping from Wells"); 4. "Leichteste Bürde" ("Lightest Burden"); 5. "Freundselig ist das Wort" ("Friendly is the Word"); 6. "Gelockert aus dem Schosse" ("Loosened from the Womb")	1941–43 orch. 1944	1956* (vs); 1951* (os)	Op. 31	Choir (SATB), soloists, orchestra	H. Jone	
=== Solo vocal ===
Three Poems: 1. "Vorfrühling" ("Early Spring"); 2. "Nachtgebet der Braut" ("Night Prayer of the Bride"); 3. "Fromm" ("Religious")	1899–1903	1965*	–	Voice, piano	F. Avenarius; R. Dehmel; G. Falke	
"Vorfrühling II" ("Early Spring II")	1900	unpubd.	–	Voice, piano	F. Avenarius	
"Wolkennacht" ("Cloud Night")	1900	unpubd.	–	Voice, piano	F. Avenarius	
"Wehmut" ("Melancholy")	1901	unpubd.	–	Voice, piano	F. Avenarius	
Eight Early Songs: 1. "Tief von fern"; 2. "Aufblick"; 3. "Blumengruss"; 4. "Bild der Liebe"; 5. "Sommerabend"; 6. "Heiter"; 7. "Der Tod"; 8. "Heimgang in der Frühe"	1901–04	1965*	–	Voice, piano	Various	
Three Songs: 1. "Gefunden"; 2. "Gebet"; 3. "Freunde"	1903–04	1965*	–	Voice, piano	F. Avenarius	
Hochsommernacht	1904	unpubd.	–	Voices, piano	M. Greif	
Five Songs: 1. "Ideale Landschaft"; 2. "Am Ufer"; 3. "Himmelfahrt"; 4. "Nächtliche Scheu"; 5. "Helle Nacht"	1906–08	1966*	–	Voice, piano	R. Dehmel	
Fünf Lieder aus 'Der siebente Ring': 1. "Dies ist ein Lied"; 2. "Im Windesweben"; 3. "An Bachesranft"; 4. "Im Morgentaun"; 5. "Kahl reckt der Baum"	1908–09	1919	Op. 3	Voice, piano	S. George	
Fünf Lieder: 1. "Eingang"; 2. "Noch zwingt mich Treue"; 3. "Ja Heil und Dank dir"; 4. "So ich traurig bin"; 5. "Ihr tratet zu dem Herde"	1908–09	1923	Op. 4	Voice, piano	S. George	
Vier Lieder: 1. "Erwachen aus dem tiefsten Traumesschosse"; 2. "Kunfttag I"; 3. "Trauer I"; 4. "Das lockere Saatgefilde"	1908–09	1970*	–	Voice, piano	S. George	
Zwei Lieder: 1. "Du, der ichs nicht sage"; 2. "Du machst mich allein"	1921; 1925	1926	Op. 8	Voice, chamber ensemble	R.M. Rilke	
Schmerz immer, Blick nach oben	1913	unpubd.	–	Voice, string quartet	A. Webern	
Three Orchestral Songs: 1. "Leise Düfte"; 2. "Kunfttag III" (Note: The "Kunfttag III" song was reconstructed by the composer Peter Westergaard); 3. "O sanftes Glühn der Berge"	1913–14	1968*	–	Soprano, orchestra	A. Webern; S. George	
Vier Lieder: 1. "Der Tag ist vergangen"; 2. "Die geheimnisvolle Flöte"; 3. "Schien mir's, als ich sah die Sonne"; 4. "Gleich und Gleich"	1915–17	1925	Op. 12	Voice, piano	Various	
Vier Lieder: 1. "Wiese im Park"; 2. "Die Einsame"; 3. "In der Fremde"; 4. "Ein Winterabend"	1914–18	1926	Op. 13	Voice, chamber ensemble	Various	
Sechs Lieder: 1. "Die Sonne"; 2. "Abendland I"; 3. "Abendland II"; 4. "Abendland III"; 5. "Nachts"; 6. "Gesang einer gefangenen Amsel"	1917–22	1924	Op. 14	Soprano, chamber ensemble	G. Trakl	
Fünf geistliche Lieder: 1. "Das Kreuz, das musst' er tragen"; 2. "Morgenlied"; 3. "In Gottes Namen aufstehn"; 4. "Mein Weg geht jetzt vorüber"; 5. "Fahr hin, o Seel’, zu deinem Gott"	1917–22	1924	Op. 15	Voice, chamber ensemble	Various	
Fünf Canons nach lateinischen Texten: 1. "Christus factus est"; 2. "Dormi Jesu"; 3. "Crux fidelis"; 4. "Asperges me"; 5. "Crucem tuam adoramus"	1923–24	1928	Op. 16	Voice, chamber ensemble	Various	
Drei Volkstexte: 1. "Armer Sünder, du"; 2. "Liebste Jungfrau, wir sind dein"; 3. "Heiland, unsre Missetaten"	1924–25	1955*	Op. 17	Voice, chamber ensemble	Various	
Drei Lieder: 1. "Schatzerl klein"; 2. "Erlösung"; 3. "Ave regina coelorum"	1925	1927	Op. 18	Voice, chamber ensemble	Various	
Drei Gesänge aus 'Viae inviae': 1. "Das dunkle Herz"; 2. "Es Stürzt aus Höhen Frische"; 3. "Herr Jesus mein"	1933–34	1936	Op. 23	Voice, piano	H. Jone	
Drei Lieder: 1. "Wie bin ich froh!"; 2. "Des Herzens Purpurvogel"; 3. "Sterne, ihr silbernen Bienen"	1934	1956*	Op. 25	Voice, piano	H. Jone	
=== Chamber ===
Two Pieces	1899	1975*	–	Cello, piano	None	
Scherzo and Trio	1904	unpubd.	–	String quartet	None	
Langsamer Satz	1905	1965*	–	String quartet	None	
String Quartet	1905	1965*	–	String quartet	None	
Rondo	1906	1970*	–	String quartet	None	
Quintet	1907	1953*	–	Piano, string quartet	None	
String Quartet (Note: The 1907 String Quartet was reconstructed by Edwin Lyle Haugan)	1907	unpubd.	–	String quartet	None	
Fünf Sätze	1909	1922	Op. 5	String quartet	None	
Vier Stücke	1910, 1914	1922	Op. 7	Violin, piano	None	
Sechs Bagatellen	1911, 1913	1924	Op. 9	String quartet	None	
Drei kleine Stücke	1914	1924	Op. 11	Cello, piano	None	
Cello Sonata	1914	1970*	–	Cello, piano	None	
[Movement]	1920	unpubd.	–	Clarinet, trumpet, violin	None	
[Movement] "Ruhig"	1925	unpubd.	–	String trio	None	
Satz	1925	1966*	–	String trio	None	
String Trio	1926–27	1927	Op. 20	String trio	None	
[Movement]	1927	unpubd.	–	String trio	None	
Quartet	1928–30	1932	Op. 22	Clarinet, tenor saxophone, violin, piano	None	
Concerto for Nine Instruments	1931–34	1948*	Op. 24	Chamber ensemble	None	
String Quartet	1936–38	1939	Op. 28	String quartet	None	
=== Piano ===
Satz	1906	1970*	–	Piano	None	
Sonatensatz (Rondo)	1906	1969*	–	Piano	None	
Kinderstück	1924	1967*	–	Piano	None	
Klavierstück	1925	1966*	–	Piano	None	
Variations	1935–36	1937	Op. 27	Piano	None	

== Arrangements ==
=== Works by the composer ===
- Sechs Stücke, Op. 6, version for chamber orchestra (1920)
- Fünf Sätze, Op. 5, version for string orchestra (1928-29)

=== Works by others ===
- "Thränenregen", "Ihr Bild", Romance [from Rosamunde], "Der Wegweiser", and "Du bist die Ruh’", by Franz Schubert, arranged for voice and orchestra (1903)
- Schatzwalzer by Johann Strauss II for string quartet, harmonium, and piano (1921)
- Chamber Symphony No. 1, op. 9, by Arnold Schoenberg, arranged for flute (or violin), clarinet (or viola), piano, violin, and cello (1922–23)
- Arbeiterchor by Franz Liszt, arranged for bass solo, chorus, and orchestra (1924)
- Deutsche Tänze (German Dances) by Schubert (1824, drawn from D.820), orchestrated by Webern (1931)
- Fuga (Ricercata) a 6 voci [Fugue No. 2] from Johann Sebastian Bach's "Musical Offering", orchestrated (1934–35)
