= Hans Moldenhauer =

Hans Moldenhauer may refer to:

- Hans Moldenhauer (musicologist), German-born musicologist, music educator, and archivist
- Hans Moldenhauer (tennis), German tennis player
- Hans-Georg Moldenhauer, German footballer

== See also ==
- Moldenhauer Archives
