= Table canon =

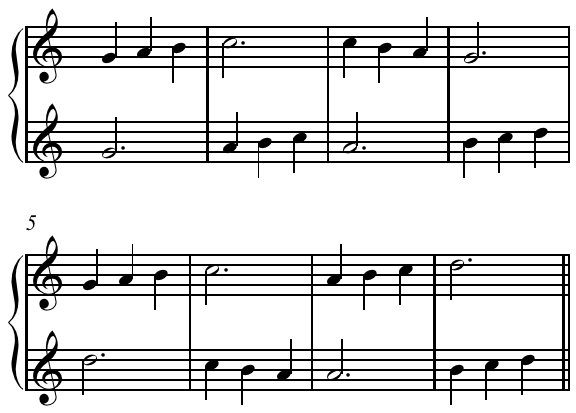
Canon.

A Table canon is a retrograde and inverse canon meant to be placed on a table in between two musicians, who both read the same line of music in opposite directions. As both parts are included in each single line, a second line is not needed. Bach's The Musical Offering contains a table canon.

== See also ==
- Mirror canon
- Crab canon
