= Melodic fission =

Phenomenon in music cognition

Melodic fission occurring in mm 1-2 of the Allemande from J.S. Bach's violin partita in B minor (BWV 1002). Red and blue have been used to denote the two separate streams.

In music cognition, melodic fission (also known as melodic or auditory streaming, or stream segregation), is a phenomenon in which one line of pitches (an auditory stream) is heard as two or more separate melodic lines. This occurs when a phrase contains groups of pitches at two or more distinct registers or with two or more distinct timbres.

The term appears to stem from a 1973 paper by W. J. Dowling. In music analysis and, more specifically, in Schenkerian analysis, the phenomenon is often termed compound melody.

In psychophysics, auditory scene analysis is the process by which the brain separates and organizes sounds into perceptually distinct groups, known as auditory streams.

The counterpart to melodic fission is melodic fusion.

== Contributing factors ==
=== Register ===
Listeners tend to perceive fast melodic sequences which contain tones from two different registers as two melodic lines. The greater the distance between groups of tones in a melody, the more likely they will be heard as two different and interrupted streams instead of one continuous stream. Studies involving the interleaving of two melodies have found that the closer the melodies are in register, the more difficult it is for listeners to perceptually separate the melodies. Tempo is important, as the threshold for registrar distance between melodic phrases still perceived as one stream increases as the tempo of the melody decreases.

=== Timbre ===
The more distinct the timbre of groups of pitches within one stream, the greater the likelihood that listeners will separate them into different streams. Similar to results found with experiments in pitch level, slower tempos increase the chance of perception of timbrally distinct pitches as one continuous stream. Timbral difference may override registral similarity in the perception of segregated streams. Additionally, quick and contrasting attack times in groups of tones lead to fission.

=== Volume ===
Differences in volume of groups of pitches can also lead to stream segregation. Logically, the louder the volume of a group of tones, the greater likelihood of melodic fission. In addition, when two streams are perceptually segregated due to differences in volume, the quieter stream is perceived as continuous, but interrupted by the louder stream.

=== Repetition ===
Perception of separate streams builds as the melodic sequence is repeated over time, first rapidly, and then at a decreased rate. However, a few factors can impede this process and "reset" fission perception, including silence between presentation of the melody, alteration of signal location (right or left ear) of the melody, and abrupt changes in volume.

== See also ==
- Bariolage
- Counterpoint
- Countermelody
- Klangfarbenmelodie
