= Laudes =

Laudes may refer to:

- Lauds, canonical hour
- A term sometimes employed by medieval scribes for Trope (music)
