= Five Pieces for Orchestra =

Compositions by Arnold Schoenberg

- by Arnold Schoenberg
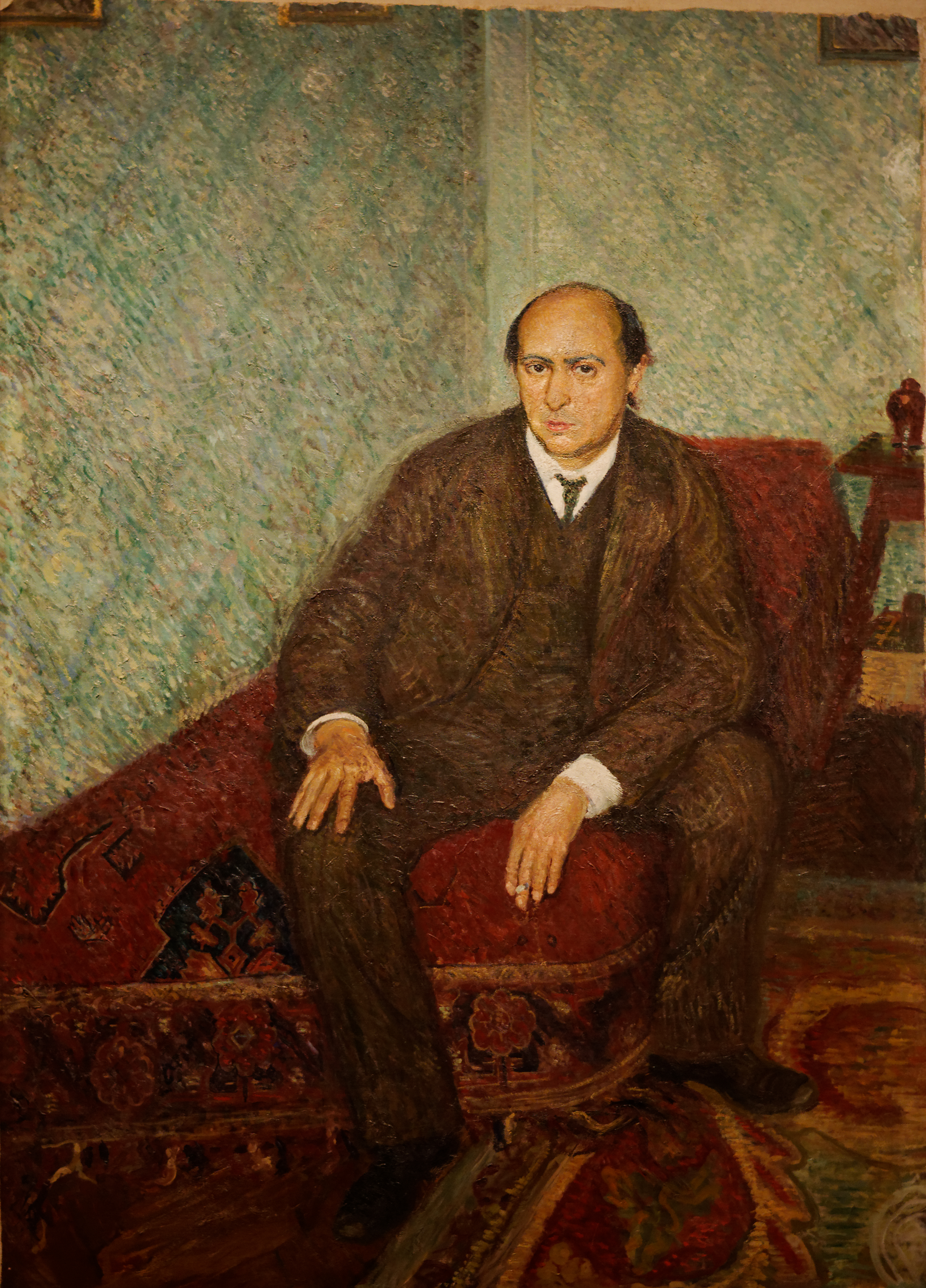
- Portrait of Arnold Schoenberg by Richard Gerstl, ca. June 1905
- Native name: Fünf Orchesterstücke
- Opus: 16
- Style: Free atonality
- Composed: 1909
- Movements: Five
- Scoring: Orchestra

Premiere
- Date: 3 September 1912
- Location: London
- Conductor: Sir Henry Wood

The Five Pieces for Orchestra (Fünf Orchesterstücke), Op. 16, were composed by Arnold Schoenberg in 1909, and first performed in London in 1912. The titles of the pieces, reluctantly added by the composer after the work's completion upon the request of his publisher, are as follows:

1. "Vorgefühle", Sehr rasch ("Premonitions", very fast)
2. "Vergangenes", Mäßige Viertel ("The Past", moderate crotchets)
3. "Sommermorgen am See (Farben)", Mäßige Viertel ("Summer Morning by a Lake (Colors)", moderate crotchets)
4. "Peripetie", Sehr rasch ("Peripeteia", very fast)
5. "Das obligate Rezitativ", Bewegte Achtel ("The Obbligato Recitative", busy quavers)

The Five Pieces further develop the notion of "total chromaticism" that Schoenberg introduced in his Three Piano Pieces, Op. 11 (composed earlier that year) and were composed during a time of intense personal and artistic crisis for the composer.

== Premiere ==
The work had its world premiere in the Queen's Hall, London, at a Promenade Concert on 3 September 1912. The premiere was conducted by Henry Wood, a constant champion of new music. During rehearsals, Schoenberg urged his reluctant players: "Stick to it, gentlemen! This is nothing to what you'll have to play in 25 years' time." The work was not well received; the critic Ernest Newman, who was receptive to Schoenberg's music, wrote after the performance:

It is not often that an English audience hisses the music it does not like, but a good third of the people at Queen's Hall last Tuesday permitted themselves that luxury after the performance of the five orchestral pieces of Schoenberg. Another third of the audience was only not hissing because it was laughing, and the remaining third seemed too puzzled either to laugh or to hiss; so that on the whole it does not look as if Schoenberg has so far made many friends in London.

== Instrumentation ==
The work exists in two different scorings: the original 1909 version for a very large orchestra and the revised version of 1949 which reduces the size of the orchestra to more standard proportions, "giving up the contrabass clarinet, as well as the four-fold scoring of the other woodwinds and two of the six horns". This version was published posthumously in 1952.

=== Original 1909 version ===
Woodwinds
Piccolo
3 Flutes (3rd doubling on 2nd piccolo)
3 Oboes
English horn
Clarinet in D
3 Clarinets (3rd doubling on contrabass clarinet in A)
Bass clarinet
3 Bassoons
Contrabassoon

Brass
6 Horns
3 Trumpets
4 Trombones
Tuba

Percussion
Timpani
Bass drum
Crash cymbals
Suspended cymbals
Triangle
Tam-tam
Xylophone
Celesta

Strings
Harp
Violins I, II
Violas
Violoncellos
Double basses

=== Revised 1949 version ===
Woodwinds
Piccolo
3 Flutes (3rd doubling on 2nd piccolo)
2 Oboes
English horn
E♭ Clarinet
2 Clarinets
Bass clarinet
2 Bassoons
Contrabassoon

Brass
4 Horns
3 Trumpets
3 Trombones
Tuba

Percussion
Timpani
Bass drum
Cymbals
Suspended cymbals
Triangle
Tam-tam
Xylophone
Celesta

Strings
Harp
Violins I, II
Violas
Violoncellos
Double basses

== Third movement ==
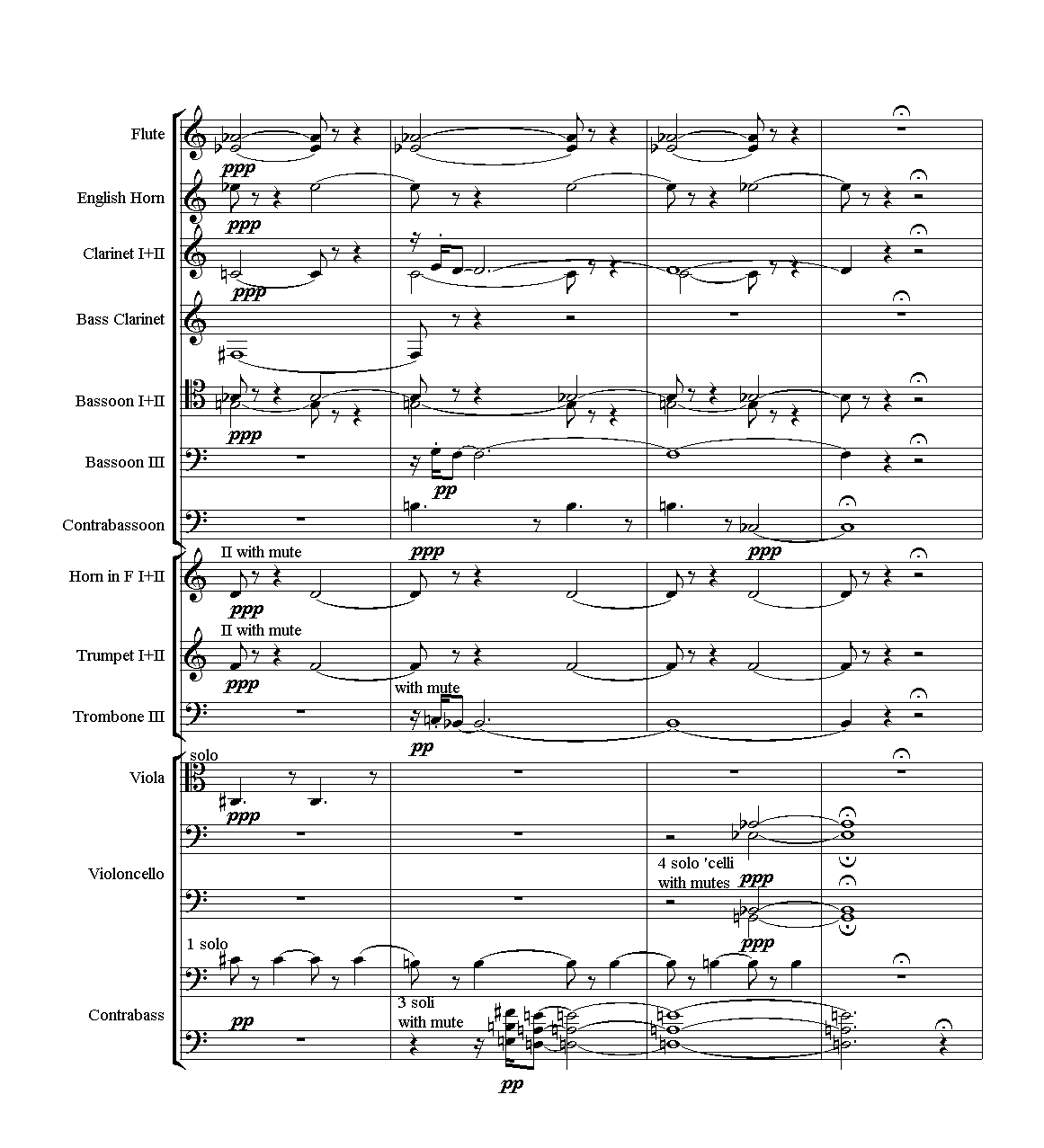
Klangfarbenmelodie in mm. 8–11 of "Summer Morning by a Lake".

According to composer Robert Erickson, in the third movement "harmonic and melodic motion is curtailed, in order to focus attention on timbral and textural elements". Blair Johnston claims that this movement is actually titled "Chord-Colors", that Schoenberg "removes all traditional motivic associations" from this piece and that it is generated from a single harmony: C–G♯–B–E–A (the Farben chord, shown below), found in a number of chromatically altered derivatives. He deems it "a kaleidoscopically rotating array of instrumental colors".

Whether or not this is an early example of what Schoenberg later termed Klangfarbenmelodie in his 1911 treatise Harmonielehre is a matter of dispute. One scholar holds that Schoenberg's "now-famous statements about 'Klangfarbenmelodie' are, however, reflections, which have no direct connection to the Orchestra Piece op. 16, no. 3". An attempt to refute this view was published in the same journal issue.

Schoenberg explains in a note added to the 1949 revision of the score: "The conductor need not try to polish sounds which seem unbalanced, but watch that every instrumentalist plays accurately the prescribed dynamic, according to the nature of his instrument. There are no motives in this piece which have to be brought to the fore".

== Second performance and influence ==
Wood invited Schoenberg to conduct London's second performance of the work in 1914. The composer's only British pupil, Edward Clark, conveyed the invitation, and on 17 January 1914 Schoenberg conducted the work at the Queen's Hall. The laughter and hissing of the first performance was not repeated, and the work was heard in silence and politely applauded. The composer was delighted with the performance and congratulated Wood and the orchestra warmly: "I must say it was the first time since Gustav Mahler that I heard such music played again as a musician of culture demands." This concert may have been attended by composer Gustav Holst, who obtained a copy of the score; this was the only Schoenberg score he ever owned. Echoes of the work appear in Holst's The Planets (originally titled Seven Pieces for Large Orchestra) and in the opening of his ballet The Lure (1921), which closely resembles the third of Schoenberg's Five Pieces.

Frank Tapp also programmed the work at the Pump Room in Bath, England, best known for its salon and light music. Some sources claim he was fired for doing so.

== Recordings ==
- Two piano arrangement by Anton Webern, performed by James Winn and Cameron Grant, Albany Records CD TROY992, UPC 034061099222
- Berlin Philharmonic, James Levine conducting, Deutsche Grammophon 419781
- Chicago Symphony Orchestra, Rafael Kubelík conducting, Mercury Living Presence 434397
- Chicago Symphony Orchestra, Daniel Barenboim conducting, Teldec 98256
- Cleveland Orchestra, Christoph von Dohnányi conducting, Decca 436240
- London Symphony Orchestra, Antal Doráti conducting, Mercury Living Presence 432006
- London Symphony Orchestra, Robert Craft conducting, Naxos 8557524
- Royal Concertgebouw Orchestra, Riccardo Chailly conducting, Decca 436467
- Royal Concertgebouw Orchestra, Eduard van Beinum conducting, Andante 4060
- Bavarian Radio Symphony Orchestra, Hermann Scherchen conducting, Orfeo D'or 274921
- Saarbrücken Radio Symphony Orchestra, Hans Zender conducting, Cpo 999481
- Sinfonieorchester des Südwestfunks, Michael Gielen conducting, WERGO WER 60185-50
- BBC Symphony Orchestra, Pierre Boulez conducting, Sony 48463
- City of Birmingham Symphony Orchestra, Simon Rattle conducting, Warner Classics 5758802
