= Crab canon =

Arrangement of two musical lines that are complementary and backward

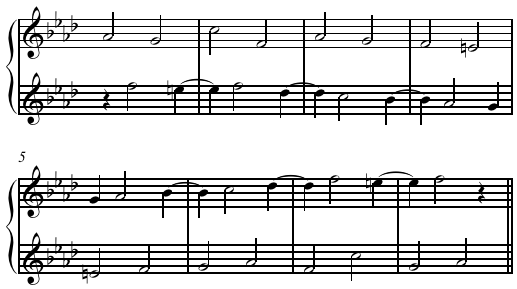
An example of a crab canon.

Requiescat Infini, an example of a crab canon (musical palindrome) composition.

A crab canon (also known by the Latin form of the name, canon cancrizans; as well as retrograde canon, canon per recte et retro or canon per rectus et inversus) is an arrangement of two musical lines that are complementary and backward. If the two lines were placed next to each other (as opposed to stacked), the lines would form something conceptually similar to a palindrome. The name 'crab' refers to the fact that crabs are known to walk backward (although they can also walk forward and sideways). It originally referred to a kind of canon in which one line is played backward (e.g. FABACEAE played simultaneously with EAECABAF). An example is found in J. S. Bach's The Musical Offering, which also contains a table canon ("Quaerendo invenietis"), which combines retrogression with inversion by having one player turn the music upside down.

== See also ==
- Gödel, Escher, Bach by Douglas Hofstadter
- Mirror canon
- The Musical Offering by Johann Sebastian Bach
