= Trope (music) =

Concepts in music

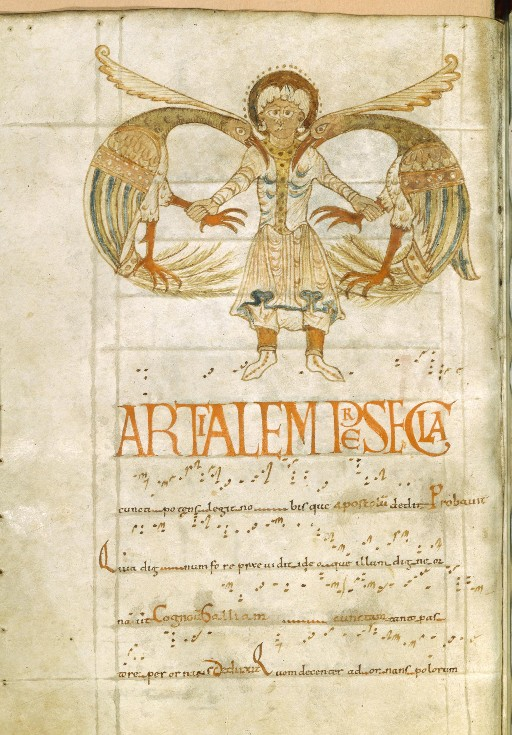
Troparium (called as such because the tropes of the chant are written down) of St. Michael, who is depicted fighting fantastic birds, 11th century

A trope or tropus in medieval music is "any textual or melodic figure that is added to an existing chant without altering the textual or melodic structure of the said chant". It has inspired certain 20th- and 21st-century music conventions as well.

The term trope derives from the Greek τρόπος (tropos), "a turn, a change", related to the root of the verb τρέπειν (trepein), "to turn, to direct, to alter, to change". The Latinised form of the word is tropus.

In music, a trope is adding another section, or trope to a plainchant or section of plainchant, thus making it appropriate to a particular occasion or festival.

== Medieval music ==
From the 9th century onward, trope refers to additions of new music to pre-existing chants in use in the Western Christian Church.

Three types of addition are found in music manuscripts:

1. new melismas without text (mostly unlabelled or called "trope" in manuscripts)
2. addition of a new text to a pre-existing melisma (more often called prosula, prosa, verba or versus)
3. new verse or verses, consisting of both text and music (mostly called trope, but also laudes or versus in manuscripts). The new verses can appear preceding or following the original material, or in between phrases.

In the Medieval era, troping was an important compositional technique where local composers could add their own voice to the body of liturgical music. These added ideas are valuable tools to examine compositional trends in the Middle Ages, and help modern scholars determine the point of origin of the pieces, as they typically mention regional historical figures (St. Saturnin of Toulouse, for example, would appear in tropes composed in Southern France). Musical collections of tropes are called tropers.

Tropes were a particular feature of the music and texts of the Sarum Use (the use of Salisbury, the standard liturgical use of England until the Reformation), although they occurred widely in the Latin Church. Deus creator omnium, was widely used in the Sarum Use and is in the form of a troped Kyrie:

Deus creator omnium, tu theos ymon nostri pie eleyson,
tibi laudes coniubilantes regum rex magne oramus te eleyson,
laus, virtus, pax et imperium cui est semper sine fine eleyson,
Christe, rex unice, patris almi nate coeterne eleyson,
qui perditum hominem salvasti, de morte reddens vite eleyson
ne pereant pascue oves tue Jesu, pastor bone, eleyson.
Consolator spiritus supplices ymas te exoramus eleyson.
Virtus nostra domine atque salus nostra in eternum eleyson,
summe deus et une, vite dona nobis tribue misertus nostrique tu digneris eleyson.

O God creator of all things, thou our merciful God eleyson,
we pray to thee, O great king of kings, singing praises together to thee eleyson,
to whom be praise, power, peace and dominion for ever without end eleyson,
O Christ, sole king, O Son coeternal with the kind Father eleyson
who saved mankind, being lost, giving life for death eleyson
lest your pastured sheep should perish, O Jesus, good shepherd eleyson.
Consoler of suppliant spirits below, we beseech thee eleyson,
O Lord, our strength and our salvation for eternity eleyson,
O highest God, grant to us the gifts of eternal life and have mercy upon us eleyson.

The standard Latin-rite ninefold Kyrie is the backbone of this trope. Although the supplicatory format ('eleyson'/'have mercy') has been retained, the Kyrie in this troped format adopts a distinctly Trinitarian cast with a tercet address to the Holy Spirit which is not present in the standard Kyrie. Deus creator omnium is thus a fine example of the literary and doctrinal sophistication of some of the tropes used in the Latin rite and its derived uses in the mediæval period.

== 20th-century music ==
In certain types of atonal and serial music, a trope is an unordered collection of different pitches, most often of cardinality six (now usually called an unordered hexachord, of which there are two complementary ones in twelve-tone equal temperament). Tropes in this sense were devised and named by Josef Matthias Hauer in connection with his own twelve-tone technique, developed simultaneously with but overshadowed by Arnold Schoenberg's.

Hauer discovered the 44 tropes, pairs of complementary hexachords, in 1921, allowing him to classify any of the 479,001,600 twelve-tone melodies into one of 44 types.

The primary purpose of the tropes is not analysis (although it can be used for it) but composition. A trope is neither a hexatonic scale nor a chord. Likewise, it is neither a pitch-class set nor an interval-class set. A trope is a framework of contextual interval relations. Therefore, the key information a trope contains is not the set of intervals it consists of (and by no means any set of pitch-classes), it is the relational structure of its intervals.

Each trope contains different types of symmetries and significant structural intervallic relations on varying levels, namely within its hexachords, between the two halves of an hexachord and with relation to whole other tropes.

Based on the knowledge one has about the intervallic properties of a trope, one can make precise statements about any twelve-tone row that can be created from it. A composer can utilize this knowledge in many ways in order to gain full control over the musical material in terms of form, harmony and melody.

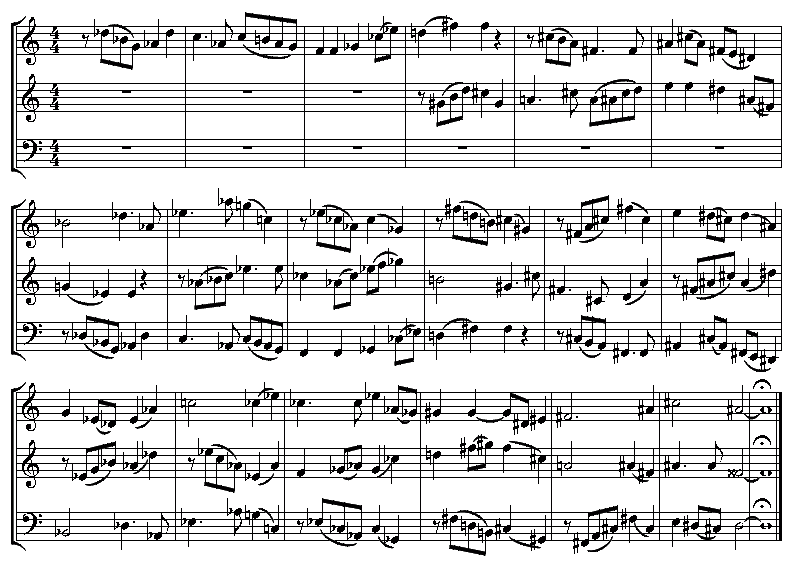
Mirror canon based on an inversional twelve-tone row (from trope 3)

The hexachords of trope no. 3 are related by inversion. Trope 3 is therefore suitable for the creation of inversional and retrograde inversional structures. Moreover, its primary formative intervals are the minor second and the major third/minor sixth. This trope contains [0,2,6] twice inside its first hexachord (e.g. F–G–B and G♭–A♭–C and [0,4,6] in the second one (e.g. A–C♯–D♯ and B♭–D–E). Its multiplications M_{5} and M_{7} will result in trope 30 (and vice versa). Trope 3 also allows the creation of an intertwined retrograde transposition by a major second and therefore of trope 17 (e.g., G–A♭–C–B–F–F♯–|–E–E♭–C♯–D–B♭–A → Bold pitches represent a hexachord of trope 17).

In general, familiarity with the tropes enables a composer to precisely predetermine a whole composition according to almost any structural plan. For instance, an inversional twelve-tone row from this trope 3 (such as G–A♭–C–B–F–F♯–D–C♯–A–B♭–E–D♯) that is harmonized by the [3–3–3–3] method as suggested by Hauer, will result in an equally inversional sequence of sonorities. This will enable the composer, for example, to write an inversional canon or a mirror fugue easily (see example 1). The symmetry of a twelve-tone row can thus be transferred to a whole composition likewise. Consequently, trope technique allows the integration of a formal concept into both a twelve-tone row and a harmonic matrix—and therefore into a whole musical piece.

== See also ==
- Trope (cantillation), (Yiddish טראָפ), the notation for accentuation and musical reading of the Bible in Jewish religious liturgy
