= Josef Humplik =

Austrian sculptor

- Born: 17 August 1888; Vienna, Austria-Hungary
- Died: 5 April 1958 (aged 69); Vienna, Austria
- Occupation: Sculptor

Josef Humplik (17 August 1888 – 5 April 1958) was an Austrian sculptor. His work was part of the sculpture event in the art competition at the 1936 Summer Olympics.

From 1921 onwards, Humplik was married to the poet and artist Hildegard Jone.
