= Langsamer Satz =

String quartet in by Anton Webern

- Chamber music by Anton Webern
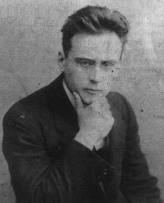
- Webern in 1912
- Composed: 1905
- Scoring: string quartet

Langsamer Satz (Slow Movement) is a composition for string quartet in one movement by Anton Webern, written in 1905.

== History ==
Webern was from 1904 a pupil of Arnold Schoenberg in Vienna. He composed Langsamer Satz for string quartet in June 1905, three years before his first work with an opus number, the Passacaglia for orchestra. The same year, he finished his first year as Schoenberg's pupil and also completed his dissertation in musicology about Heinrich Isaac.

In the spring of 1905, Webern had hiked with his cousin Wilhelmine Mortl, and future wife, outside Vienna, and fallen in love with her. The music is believed to have been inspired by his feelings for her. Webern's string quartet in one movement was also written this year..

The work was lost but rediscovered in the early 1960s when Hans and Rosaleen Moldenhauer found manuscripts in an attic in Perchtoldsdorf. It was published by Carl Fischer.

== Music ==
The music of Langsamer Satz is marked Langsam, mit bewegtem Ausdruck (Slow, with moving expression). The piece, in E-flat major, is still composed in the tradition of Johannes Brahms, especially in matters of sonority and rhetoric, while special effects such as tremolo sul ponticello are new, and a precursor of the String Quartet, Op. 5, written in 1909.

The style compares to Schoenberg's late-Romantic Verklärte Nacht. Described as "a love song to the woman he would later marry", the music is very expressive, portraying yearning, "dramatic turmoil" and peaceful tranquility. The duration is given as eight minutes.

== Recordings ==
Langsamer Satz was recorded in 2018 by the Airis Quartet in a collection with string quartets by Karl Amadeus Hartmann. It was recorded in 2019 by the Arod Quartet, together with works by Schoenberg and Alexander von Zemlinsky. A reviewer from Gramophone wrote that the quartet was played "breathtakingly clean, like mountain air" and was able to evoke a flower meadow. The Leonkoro Quartet issued a new recording in 2026.
