= Concerto for Nine Instruments (Webern) =

1934 composition by Anton Webern

- by Anton Webern
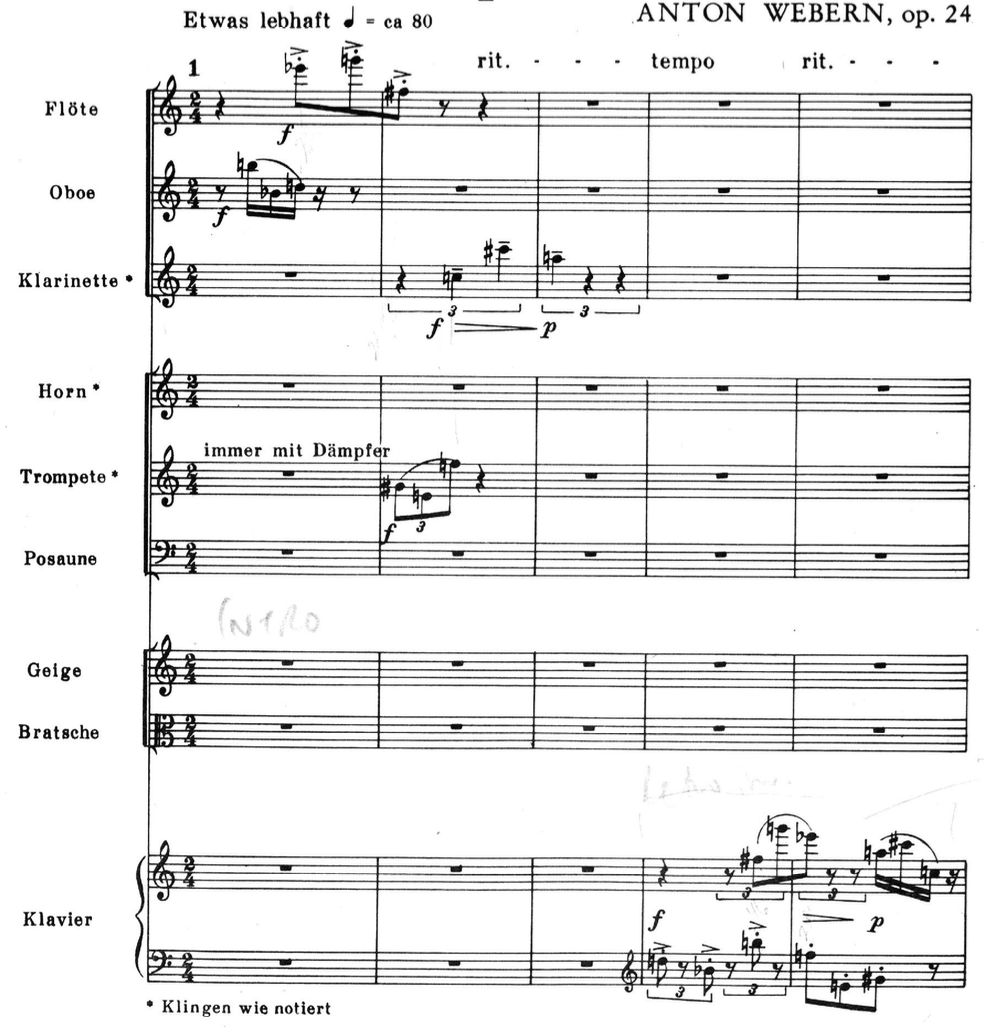
- Incipit of Concerto, op. 24
- English: Concerto for Nine Instruments
- Full title: Konzert, op. 24
- Opus: 24
- Year: 1934
- Genre: Chamber music
- Style: Dodecaphonic
- Composed: January 1931 – September 1934
- Dedication: Arnold Schoenberg, for his 60th birthday
- Performed: International Society for Contemporary Music Music Days
- Published: 1948
- Publisher: Universal Edition
- Duration: 9'
- Scoring: flute, oboe, clarinet, horn, trumpet, trombone, violin, viola, and piano

Premiere
- Date: September 4, 1935
- Location: Prague
- Conductor: Heinrich Jalowetz

Anton Webern's Concerto for Nine Instruments, Op. 24 (German: Konzert für neun Instrumente) is a twelve-tone chamber piece composed in 1934. Its tone row is one of the most notable in history. The piece is admired for its extreme concision and is considered a hallmark in the development of total serialism.

== Composition ==
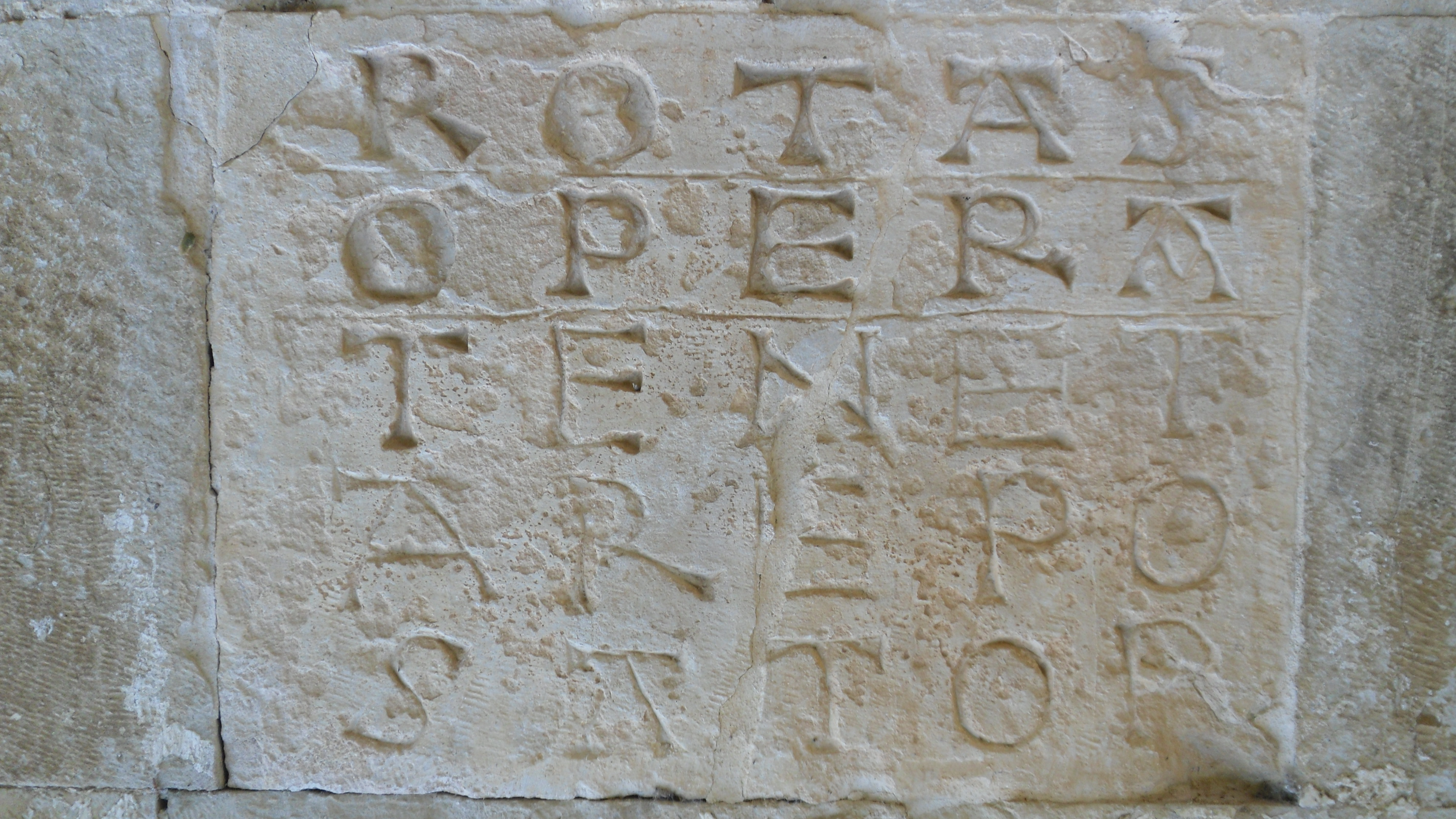
Sator Square (Oppède-le-Vieux, France)

By the late 1920s, Webern had developed an extraordinary application of Arnold Schoenberg's twelve-tone technique in works like String Trio (1927), Symphony (1928), and Quartet (1932).

Webern began sketching an orchestral work on January 16, 1931. In early February, Webern began attempting to create a melodic equivalent of a Sator Square. Webern had long been enamored of the square. In addition to writing "tenet" in his first sketch for the Concerto, he ended his lectures about new music by quoting it to his audience. The essentially meaningless square arranges all the letters contained in the phrase "a[lpha] pater noster o[mega]" in highly palindromic configurations that read both horizontally and vertically.

Webern ended up turning to a three-note musical germ (C♯–C–E) he had used in his 1905 String Quartet to generate the row. It is analogous to Ludwig van Beethoven's "Muss es Sein (Must it be)?" motif. The minor second adjacent to a third proved highly malleable, and Webern constructed the remainder of the row by performing the standard dodecaphonic operations on it: inversion, reversal, reverse inversion, and transposition.

The tone row is shown below:

In this tone row, the opening trichord is a descending minor second (m2: B–B♭) followed by an ascending major third (M3: B♭–D). The second trichord reverses and inverts (RI) the intervals: M3↑ (E♭–G); m2↓ (G–F♯). The third trichord reverses (R) the original pattern: d4(M3)↓ (A♭–E); m2↑ (E–F). The final trichord inverts (I) the original pattern: m2↑ (C–C♯); M3↓ (C♯–A).

In the 1931 sketches, Webern was still conceiving of the piece as an orchestral work with programmatic movements titled "Einersdorf, Schwabegg, and Annabichl". The ensemble would include tympani, harp, and glockenspiel. However, three years earlier, the composer began to radically reduce his orchestrations, stripping out instruments he considered extravagant. The result was a spartan ensemble that first appeared in his Symphony (1927–1928) and the reorchestration of Sechs Stücke, Op. 6. In the Concerto, Webern would eventually reduce the orchestra to solo instruments with no more than three representatives per section.

Though he developed the row quickly, Webern would not be able to fully focus on the piece until 1934. Once he settled on the scheme for the piece, it came rushing out in 1934. This was a period of great isolation in Mödling for the composer. Webern's concertizing career was essentially ended by the dissolution of the Austrian social democratic party, and he had been labeled a "cultural Bolshevik" by neighboring Germans.

Although Webern finished the Concerto in time for Schoenberg's 60th birthday, it would take another year before its first performance. The composer was scheduled to conduct the premiere at the International Society for Contemporary Music Music Days in Prague, but he decided not to attend because of the festival's removal of Alban Berg's Wozzeck from its 1934 program.

== Form ==
Webern hews to the usual structure of the genre and divides his Concerto into three movements. The writing is in Webern's highly unique version of klangfarbenmelodie. Its extreme concision has been called "musical shorthand". There are no soloists, but each instrument is playing miniature solos of 2–3 notes apiece which aggregate into the "gathering" implied by the title.

=== I. Etwas lebhaft ===
The first movement is marked "Etwas lebhaft" (somewhat lively) with a tempo of = 80. Webern's tone row is played a trichord at a time by the oboe, flute, trumpet, and clarinet. Each instrument slows the perceived tempo through a rhythmic decelerando. The oboe's sixteenth notes are answered by the flute's eighths. The trumpet notches the rhythms up slightly to eighth note triplets before the clarinet finishes the deceleration by playing in quarter note triplets. The bar has been divided in 8ths, 4ths, 6ths, and finally 3rds. To emphasize the deceleration, Webern asks the clarinet to execute a ritardando.

Entrances elide, and articulations are mismatched. The dynamic is f (forte), with a diminuendo to p (piano) that corresponds with the ritardando.

When the piano enters in the fourth bar, it summarizes the tone row in a written accelerando. The rhythmic progression is reversed exactly. Webern chooses a transposition of the retrograde inversion that also precisely reverses each trichord of the original row. The piano also repeats the dynamic pattern and the variegated articulations of the first phrase. The first two statements of the Concerto form a mirror image, a recurring metaphor in Webern's music.

=== II. Sehr langsam ===
The second movement is marked "Sehr langsam" (very slow) with a mathematically identical tempo to the first movement = 40. The piano accompanies the other eight instruments as they collectively perform a melody. The movement's interchange between horizontal melodies and vertical chords is indicative of how masterfully Webern could manipulate his material.

The first 11 bars of the movement can be heard as the antecedent of a period, with the consequent running to bar 21. The movement correlates to the binary classical forms that are so often found in Webern's work. The eclectic rhythms of the first movement have been replaced exclusively by quarter and half notes. The Concerto's row is transposed to G. Webern saw the tritone transposition of a row as analogous to the dominant. The second movement does indeed build up to a retrograde statement of the row on C♯ before closing with a recapitulation of the row on G.

=== III. Sehr rasch ===
The finale is marked "Sehr rasch" (very quickly) and triples the speed of the previous movement to = 120. The mood change from the previous movements is abrupt. Its march tempo and syncopated rhythms hurtle along in a brash manner that is unique for Webern. The movement has five sections, just like the sator square. It uses the original form of the row that Webern worked out in his sketches, beginning on F. In the final fifteen bars, Webern arranges the trichords into the musical equivalent of the magic square that had inspired him.

== Reception ==
Webern's Concerto was a seminal work for the emerging practice of serial music. Luigi Dallapiccola attended the premiere and was stunned by the work. He called the Concerto "a work of incredible conciseness...and of unique concentration...Although I did not understand the work completely, I had the feeling of finding an aesthetic and stylistic unity as great as I could wish for."

Karlheinz Stockhausen wrote an influential analysis of Webern's Concerto in 1953 for the journal Melos. Stockhausen argued that Webern made a fundamental break with Arnold Schoenberg's method by permuting the trichords of the row. He also highlights the serial ordering of parameters like articulation, duration, and dynamics. In doing so, Stockhausen felt Webern had penetrated to the internal nature of sound itself, hinting at a deconstruction of music in order to build new sounds entirely. His analysis obliquely references the electronic music Stockhausen was pioneering at the time. In Stockhausen's view, what Webern does in the Concerto cannot be undone.

Webern's tone row for the Concerto is considered "a paragon of symmetrical construction". As set theory developed in the 1950s, Webern's op. 24 row was often cited by analysts. Because the first three notes of the tone row generate the remaining nine, it is an example of a derived row. The two hexachords are also all-combinatorial, making them one of the six available source sets. This hexachord is found in a number of pieces like Nikolai Rimsky-Korsakov's Antar (1868) and Arnold Schoenberg's Ode to Napoleon (1942).
