= Perceptual attack time =

Perceptual Attack Time (often abbreviated "PAT") is a subjective measure of the time instant at which a musical sound's rhythmic emphasis is heard. It is analogous to the perceptual centre (aka "p-centre") in speech.

It is different from both the physical onset (i.e., the time at which the sound's acoustic energy first begins) and the perceptual onset (i.e., the subjective time at which a listener first notices that the sound has begun). For a very percussive sound such as a note played on a closed hi hat cymbal the perceptual attack time may be just a few milliseconds, while for a note bowed slowly on a violin the perceptual attack time may be as much as 50–100 milliseconds after the physical onset.

== Applications ==
Understanding the perceptual attack time of recorded sounds is important when scheduling those sounds to be played by a computer. For example, suppose you want to play a melody on a series of notes from different instruments. If the notes' physical onsets are equally spaced, the result will probably sound a little bit unsteady or out of rhythm; to get a rhythmically correct result it's necessary to account for each sound's perceptual attack time, i.e., to schedule the notes so that their perceptual attack times, not their onsets, are spaced according to the rhythm of the melody.
