= Passacaglia (Webern) =

Composition for orchestra by Anton Webern

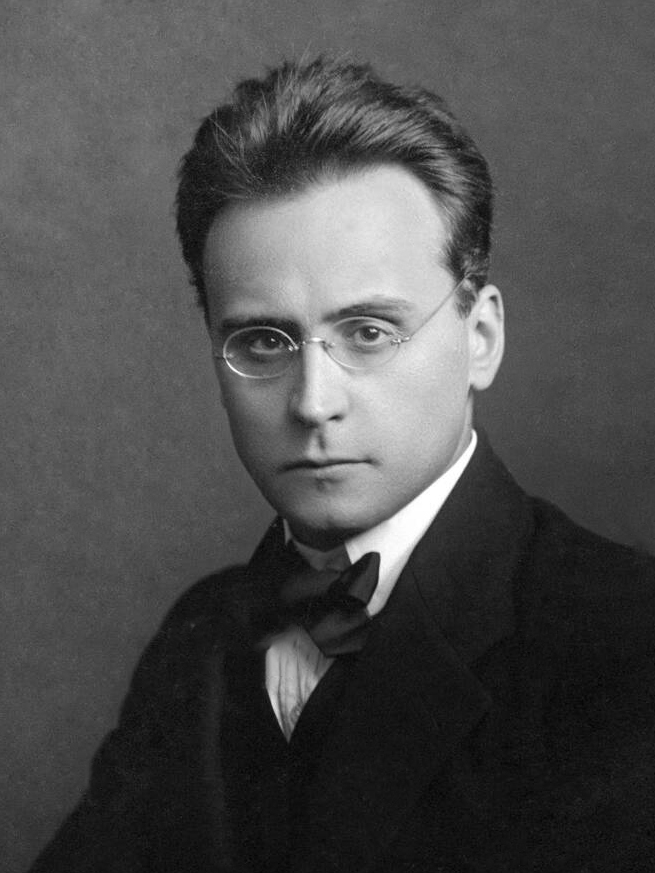
Composer Anton Webern in Stettin, October 1912

The Passacaglia for orchestra, Op. 1, is a musical composition that Anton Webern completed in 1908. It was his first published work and is among his earliest music for symphony orchestra. It is in passacaglia form and marks the culmination of his studies with Arnold Schoenberg.

== Composition ==
=== Background ===
Webern's Passacaglia (1908) was his first major orchestral work since Im Sommerwind (1904). He wrote several preliminary sketches, including three short movements in A minor for orchestra. The 1906 death of his mother, he suggested, affected his music from this time.

=== Form ===
As the title suggests, the work adopts the passacaglia form, in which a ground bass pattern, the ostinato, supports changing melodies above it, typically in eight-bar phrases. Webern's approach honored this tradition while pushing it forward in a manner recalling the passacaglia finale of Johannes Brahms's Symphony No. 4. According to Hans Moldenhauer, these passacaglias of Brahms and Webern share a somewhat restrained decorum punctuated by outbursts. Webern wrote in 2/4 time, not conventional triple meter. In an increasingly modernist idiom, he used silence structurally and wrote for small groups of instruments, creating more diaphanous textures as in chamber music.

The main theme of the Passacaglia is an eight-bar phrase in D minor on pizzicato strings marked ppp. Webern described its 23 variations in program notes from a 1922 Düsseldorf concert. There are eleven variations in minor keys, four in major keys, and then eight more in minor, followed by a coda with some development.

=== Instrumentation ===
The work is scored for a large orchestra comprising two flutes, piccolo, two oboes, cor anglais, two clarinets, bass clarinet, two bassoons, contrabassoon, four horns, three trumpets, three trombones, tuba, timpani, percussion (cymbals, bass drum, triangle, tam-tam), harp, and strings.

== Premiere ==
Seven or more of Schoenberg's pupils organized their own first public concert (after their 1907 invitation-only concert) at Vienna's Musikverein on 4 November 1908, hiring the Tonkünstler Orchestra. Webern conducted his own Passacaglia and performed O. de Ivanov's Suite for piano four hands with Marietta Jonas-Werndorff.

Invited music critics condemned the music. The Illustrirtes Wiener Extrablatt reviewer wrote (5 November) that Erwin Stein and Webern chased dissonance for effect like Schoenberg, and that the Passacaglia showed "[r]espect for form, without content".

Only Elsa Bienenfeld, in the Neues Wiener Journal (9 November), praised the Passacaglia, singling it out as a mature and compelling example of music and emotion. She compared it to that of Brahms's Fourth while noting its "original" timbres, "free" harmony, and unconventional but deliberate use of imitation in its "manifold interlacings of counterpoint" with "peculiar melodic inventiveness".
