= Hildegard Jone =

Austrian poet (1891–1963)

Hildegard Jone (1 June 1891 – 28 August 1963) was an Austrian poet and artist. As a poet she produced poetry collections and books throughout her life. She was also a painter and sculptor, with works infused with Expressionism and Christian imagery.

Many of her lyric poems were set to music by her colleague Anton Webern.

== Life and career ==
Hildegard Jone was born Hildegard Huber on 1 June 1891 in Sarajevo of Austria-Hungary. Her parents were the architect Ludwig Huber and Amélie (née the Countess Deym), both of whom encouraged her early interest in the arts. In 1908 Jone and her mother moved to Vienna so the former could attend the Wiener Frauenakademie, a women's art academy. At the Frauenakademie, her instructor was the sculptor Josef Humplik; the two would later marry in 1921.

As a visual artist, Jone created paintings and sculptures throughout her life. Her work was often Expressionist and infused with Christian imagery or inspiration. Jone was well acquainted with many other artists and writers of her time, including Peter Altenberg, Adolf Loos, Ludwig von Ficker and Karl Kraus, who became a spiritual mentor.

Jone is well known for her collaborations with the composer Anton Webern, who set her music numerous times. Webern's compositions on poems by Jone include the song cycles Drei Gesänge aus 'Viae inviae' (1934), Drei Lieder (1934), the orchestral-choral work Das Augenlicht ("The Eyes' Radiance") and both his first (1939) and second (1943) cantatas.

Jone died on 28 August 1963 in Purkersdorf, near Vienna. Purkersdorf's local museum includes a room dedicated to Jone and her husband.

== Writings ==
all in German

- Jone, Hildegard (1918). "Ring, Mein Bewußtsein!" [Ring, My Consciousness!]. Verlag des Ver. No. 14/15. Vienna.
  - —— (May 1918). "Ring, Mein Bewußtsein!" [Ring, My Consciousness!]. Verlag des Ver. Das neue Gedicht 6 [The New Poem 6]. Vienna.
- —— (Spring 1927). "Der Mensch im Dunkeln" [Man in Dark]. Der Brenner. No. 11. Innsbruck. pp. 101–156.
- —— (Autumn 1932). "Via inviae. Im Gedenken an Ferdinand Ebner" [Via inviae. In memory of Ferdinand Ebner]. Der Brenner. No. 13. Innsbruck. pp. 60–74.
- —— (1938). Selige Augen [Blessed Eyes]. Zeugen des Wortes 11 [Witnessess of the World 11]. Freiburg: Herder. OCLC 66200229.
- —— (1948). Anima. Gedichte des Gottesjahres [Anima. Poems of the Year of God]. Vienna: Herder. OCLC 63059357.
- —— (1948). Tu auf dein Herz [Open Your Heart]. Vienna: Herder.
