= Retrograde inversion =

Melodic inversion and reversed ordering of a musical motif's pitches

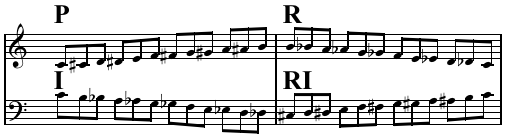
A chromatic scale in its original or prime form (P), reversed (R), inverted (I), and in retrograde inversion (RI).

Retrograde inversion is the practice of flipping and reversing a musical passage. Used throughout music history, the technique gained prominence in the 20th century through the work of the Second Viennese School.

== Definition ==
Retrograde inversion is the process of playing a melody upside down and backwards. It combines two closely related horizontal and vertical mirror techniques: inversion and retrogression.

Inversion turns every interval in the melody upside down. Where a chromatic scale proceeds upwards by semitones, its inversion moves downwards by semitones. Retrogression reverses all of the pitches in a melody. The retrograde inversion of a melody is its inverted form played in reverse.

== History ==
The Italian marking Al rovescio could refer to either an inverted or a reversed passage of music. Reversed and inverted passages are extensively found in Ars Nova. The techniques were closely related, but they were not often combined into retrograde inversion. Some composers did write in retrograde inversion such as Jacob Obrecht and Antoine Busnois.

Retrograde inversion could be found in highly specialized mirror canons where the comes is the dux upside down and in reverse. These works were known as canon al contrario riverso. Johann Sebastian Bach composed a notable example in The Musical Offering. The canon begins with an alto clef and an upside down bass clef to indicate the way it should be performed.

As Arnold Schoenberg developed twelve-tone technique, retrograde inversion became a crucial compositional strategy. Along with transposition, a tone row could be transformed through inversion (I), retrograde (R), and retrograde inversion (RI) in ways that would generate enough harmony and counterpoint to sustain prolonged compositions. These three transformations and the original tone row, which is sometimes called its "prime", are the four basic forms of any set.

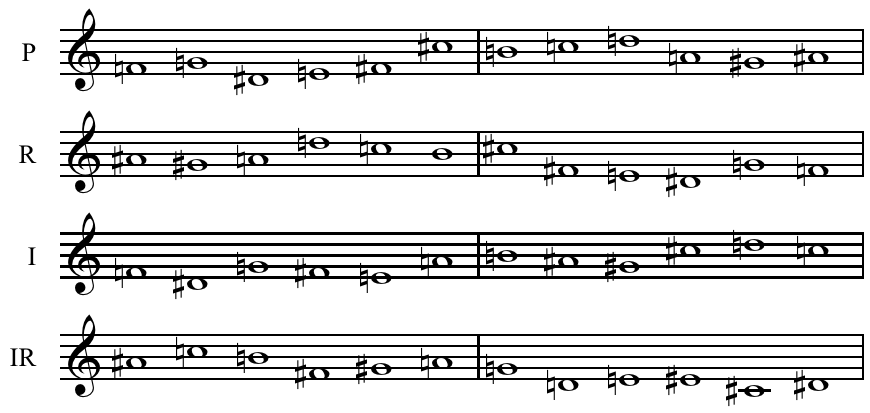
A sample of some row forms from Igor Stravinsky's Requiem Canticles where the inverted retrograde (IR) is used instead of retrograde inversion.

During his doctoral studies in musicology, Anton Webern focused on early counterpoint, particularly the Franco-Flemish School. He repeatedly cited such work as an inspiration for his own. Webern eventually began germinating twelve-tone rows by applying the three primary operations (I, R, RI) to three-note cells. In Concerto for Nine Instruments, the first operation Webern applies to the original trichord of the tone row is retrograde inversion.

The technique was not limited to serial composers in the 20th century. The Postludium of Paul Hindemith's Ludus Tonalis is an exact retrograde inversion of the work's opening Praeludium.

A common alternative to retrograde inversion is inverted retrograde (IR), where the reversed melody is inverted. In later works like Requiem Canticles (1966), Igor Stravinsky preferred to use inverted retrograde, although he often conflated it with retrograde inversion in his sketches.
