= Hans Moldenhauer (musicologist) =

German-American musicologist (1906–1987)

Hans Moldenhauer (December 13, 1906, Mainz – October 19, 1987, Spokane) was a German and American musicologist, archivist, and music educator known for his scholarship on the composer Anton Webern and for collecting and preserving the Moldenhauer Archives with his second wife and assistant, Rosaleen Moldenhauer. He studied music with conductor Hans Rosbaud before immigrating to the United States in 1938. After settling in Spokane, Washington, he founded the Spokane Conservatory of Music in 1942 and went on to teach on the faculty at the University of Washington. The Moldenhauers' holdings were later dispersed to major research libraries in the United States and Europe.

== Life and career ==
Hans Moldenhauer was born in Mainz, Germany in 1906. He was raised in a Christian family by parents Richard Moldenhauer and Thekia Weil, and was conscious of his Jewish ancestry (he traced his mother's ancestry to Abraham Weil, the Kingdom of Bavaria's first Jewish tax official). He was enthusiastic about mountaineering from his youth and studied under conductor Hans Rosbaud at the Hochschule für Musik Mainz.

In 1938, he fled fascism to the United States and arrived in New York City, where he was soon joined by his first wife, Margot, their two children, and his mother-in-law. He read about the mountainous Northwest and in 1939, bought a single bus ticket to Spokane, Washington. He guided a summit of nearby Mount Rainier and settled in Spokane, where he earned a living as a piano teacher and met Rosaleen Jackman, his pupil and assistant. Drafted into the U.S. Army, he served in the 10th Mountain Division as an instructor in Colorado, where Rosaleen found work as a nurse for the American Red Cross. A frostbite injury at Camp Hale kept him from combat.

In 1942, he founded the Spokane Conservatory of Music, and in 1943, he and Rosaleen were married in Colorado. The 1944 G.I. Bill helped him study at Whitworth University (B.A., 1945), where he had been the first student. He incorporated Spokane Conservatory in 1946 and served as its president for many years. At Chicago Musical College, he studied musicology (Ph.D., 1951). Around this time, he received a retinitis pigmentosa diagnosis and was told he would lose his sight within two years. This intensified his collecting of manuscripts, which he and Rosaleen preserved in Spokane. The prognosis proved inaccurate.

After acquiring the papers of Anton Webern, the Moldenhauer Archives became notable in the 1960s. Moldenhauer published many scholarly articles on Webern, taught on the music faculty at the University of Washington (1961–64), and guest lectured at many universities, including in Europe. While writing the major biography, he was disturbed to the point of anger by Webern's nationalism during the Nazi era, and Rosaleen suggested he might consider abandoning the project. More than twenty years after diagnosis, as his visual impairment became severe, she helped him continue his efforts, including completing the biography. Their work together, stretching over some forty years, culminated in the Moldenhauer Archives, with its holdings of about 3,500 music manuscripts and related materials ranging from medieval to new music in the West.

Rosaleen died in 1982, and Moldenhauer died in 1987. With the assistance of his widow Mary, the collection was dispersed according to his wishes. Northwestern University holds a considerable portion. The Paul-Sacher-Stiftung (Paul Sacher Foundation) holds most of the Webern manuscripts in Basel, Switzerland, though a portion of these and the archive's other manuscripts, including Ernest Bloch's Schelomo, are held by the Library of Congress in Washington, D.C., both as a memorial to Rosaleen and in view of Moldenhauer's journey to the United States. The Austrian National Library in Vienna, the Bavarian State Library in Munich, and Harvard Library in Cambridge, Massachusetts, among other institutions, also hold portions of the collection.
