= Klangfarbenmelodie =

Musical concept that treats timbre as a melodic element

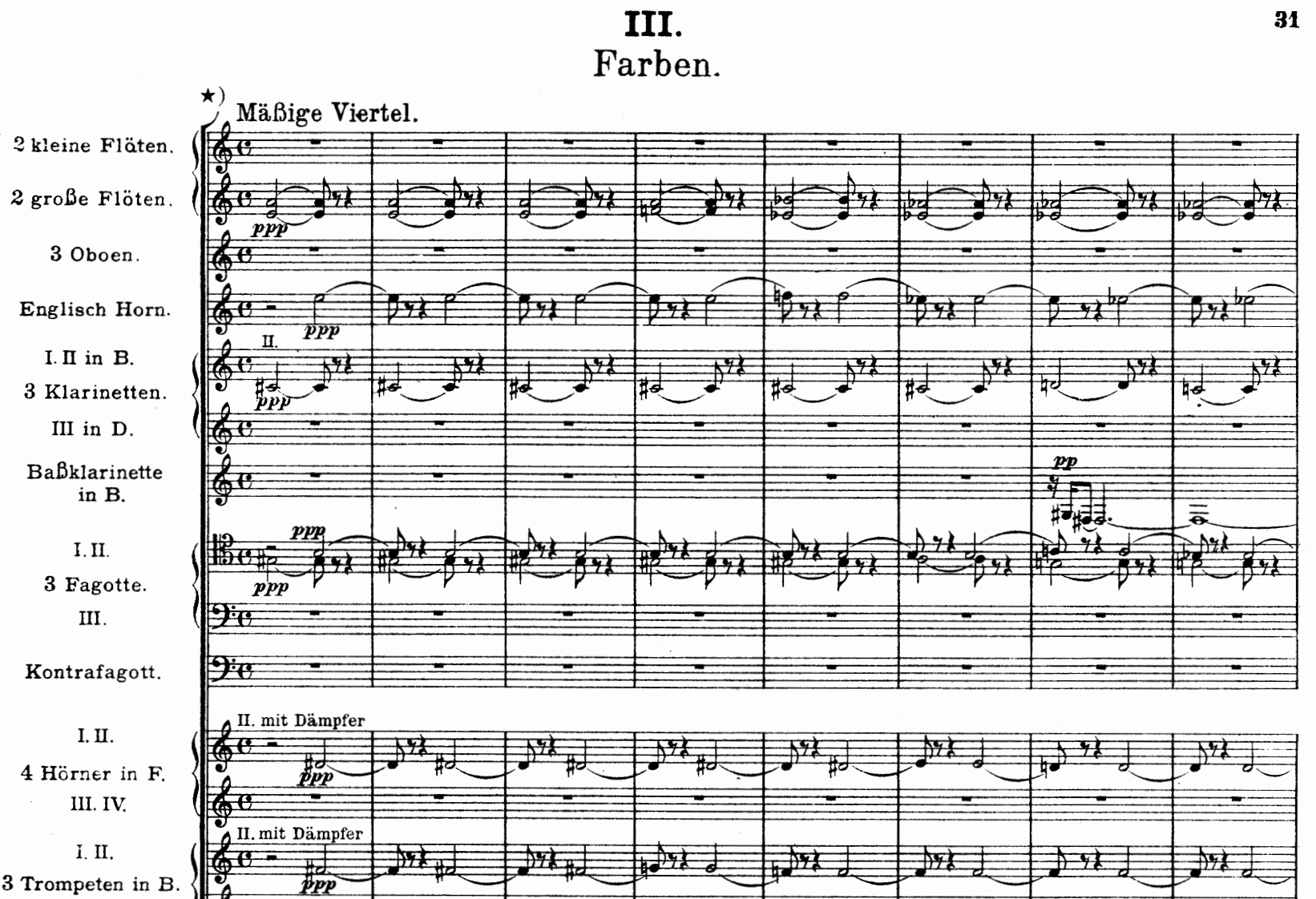
Detail from "Farben", 3rd movement of Arnold Schoenberg's Fünf Orchesterstücke Op. 16 (1909).

Klangfarbenmelodie (German for "sound-color melody") is a musical concept that treats timbre as a melodic element. Arnold Schoenberg originated the idea. It has become synonymous with the technique of fragmenting a melodic line between different timbres.

== Origins ==
Late in the 19th century, a sophisticated treatment of musical timbre started to emerge in works like Claude Debussy's Prélude à l'après-midi d'un faune. During the same period, Hermann von Helmholtz theorized that timbre is part of what enables a listener to perceive melody.

In 1911, Arnold Schoenberg analyzed musical sound (klang) as consisting of pitch (höhe), timbre (farbe), and volume (stärke). He noted that pitch was the only element that had undergone close examination, but he viewed it as subordinate to timbre, "...tone becomes perceptible by virtue of tone color, of which one dimension is pitch". He looked forward to a more sophisticated appreciation of tone color. Schoenberg also described a "futuristic fantasy" of tone color "progressions whose relations with another work with a kind of logic entirely equivalent to that logic which satisfies us in the melody of pitches". He rhapsodized:

Tone-color melodies! How acute the senses that would be able to perceive them! How high the development of spirit that could find pleasure in such subtle things!

In its original sense, Schoenberg envisioned klangfarbenmelodie as a sequence of tone colors. There could be just one pitch, but the changing timbres are what create the semblance of melody. Because Schoenberg never clearly defined the term, it was widely misunderstood. There remains no clear definition of the term.

In 1951, Schoenberg felt compelled to revisit the concept in two short writings. One was an essay about Anton Webern's use of klangfarbenmelodie. He balked at Webern's use of traditional form schemes while using the technique. Just as melody and counterpoint gave birth to unique forms, Schoenberg believed that klangfarbenmelodie would require new forms that suited their nature.

Schoenberg also dispatched duplicate letters to Luigi Dallapiccola and Josef Rufer on January 19, 1951. He asked them to only reveal the missives if his invention of klangfarbenmelodie were ever doubted. The letter also expands on the concept by explaining the "klänge" in question could be entire passages of music that would be modulated by tone color. He specifically pointed to three examples from his catalogue: "the tomb scene of Pelleas und Melisande, or much of the introduction to the fourth movement of my second String Quartet, or the fugue figure from the second Piano Piece...They are never merely individual tones of different instruments at different times, but rather combinations of moving voices."

Schoenberg explored klangfarbenmelodie in Five Orchestral Pieces op. 16 (1909). The third piece in the suite is titled "Farben". It features a standing chord that is translated into a klangfarbenmelodie through the restless orchestration. Alban Berg used this technique in the first of his Altenberg Lieder.

This original sense of klangfarbenmelodie has its most direct descendants in the practitioners of spectral music, which prizes timbre as a structural element.

== Melodic Version ==
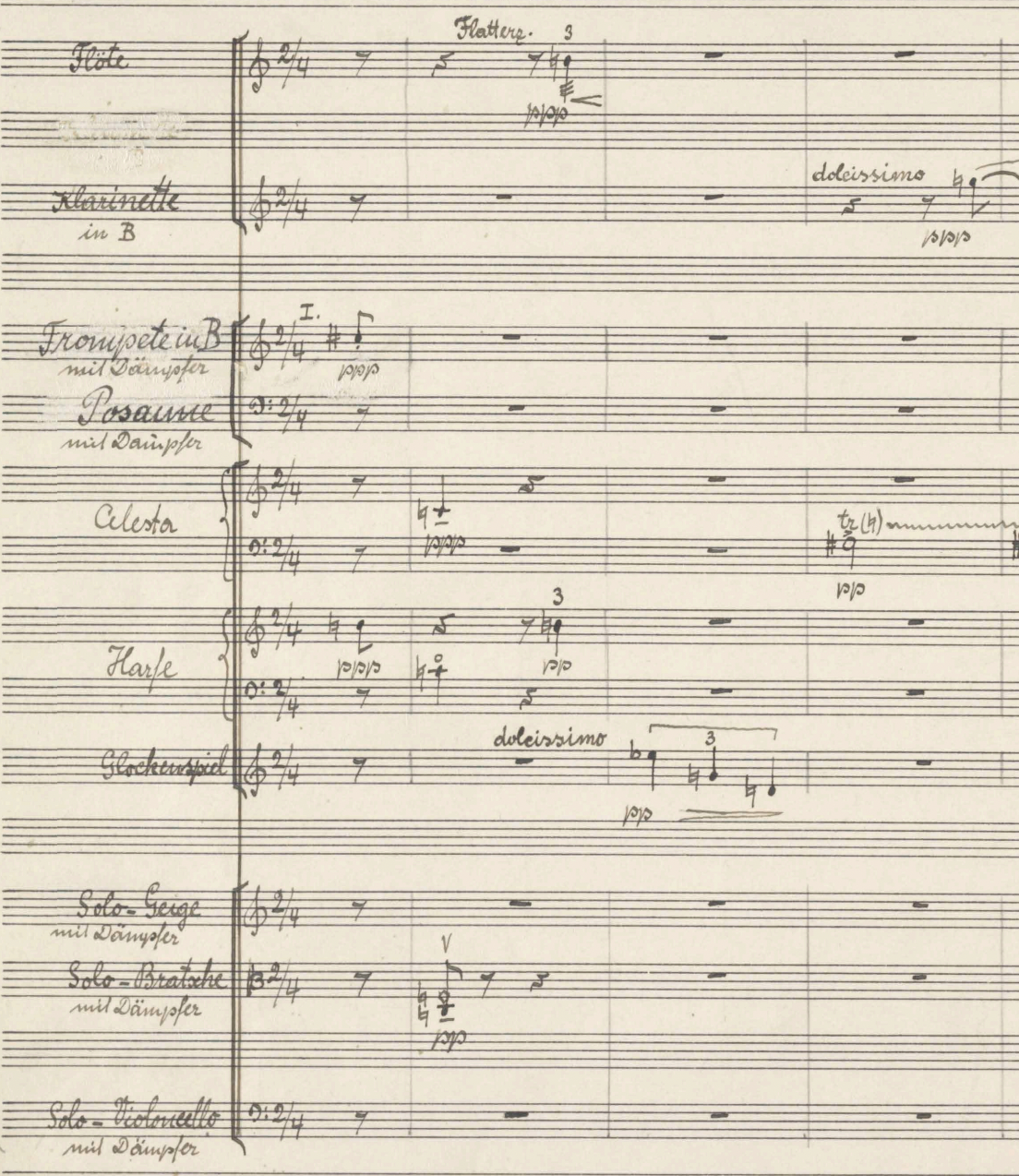
Incipit of Anton Webern's Fünf Stücke für Orchester Op. 10

Incipit of Bach's Ricercar a 6 arranged by Webern

The more familiar meaning of klangfarbenmelodie is when a melodic line is fragmented between different timbres. There are many historical precedents to the concept. In practice, composers are writing in hocket when they deploy klangfarbenmelodie. The technique can also be found in polyphonic precedents like Annibale Padovano's treatment of the cantus firmus in his music.

Anton Webern used this pointillistic technique extensively. A classic example is the opening melodic statement of his Fünf Stücke für Orchester Op. 10 (1913) which requires the efforts of the flute, trumpet, celeste, harp, glockenspiel, viola, and clarinet often playing just one note each. In Webern's hocketization of Schoenberg's concept, timbres are often mixed but not combined. The effect creates a sense of a compound melody, where the pitch content moves more swiftly than the timbres. The music feels contrapuntally dense while it is in fact quite sparse. In Schoenberg's 1951 letter, he wrote, "My conception of Klangfarbenmelodie would have been fulfilled in Webern’s compositions only in the slightest part." He felt that Webern's understanding of the concept was an error. The impetus for Schoenberg's letter was partially to reclaim ownership of the concept which had become so synonymous with his pupil's work.

In fact, Webern was employing the concept in pieces like Sechs Stücke op. 6 (1909) before Schoenberg wrote about it. The first movement of Webern's Symphony op. 21 offers an archetypal example of klangfarbenmelodie, where nearly every pitch is colored by a different instrument. In Webern's usage, klangenfarbenmelodie articulates the motivic structure of a piece. This is especially evident in his orchestration of the six-part ricercar from Bach's Musical Offering.

Webern's preoccupation with klangenfarbenmelodie continues through his seminal Concerto for Nine Instruments op. 24 (1934). It became a landmark in the development of serial music. Serialism was a continuation of the Second Viennese School's innovations. Composers like Karlheinz Stockhausen systematized musical parameters like pitch, rhythm, and timbre. Klangfarbenmelodie was particularly influential in the development of electronic music.

== See also ==
- Hocket
- Klang (music)
- Melodic fission
