= Mirror canon =

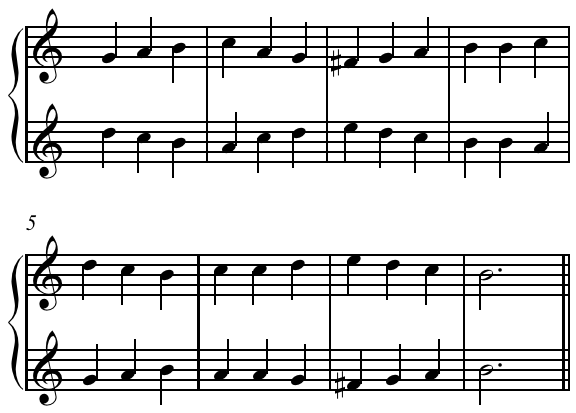
Mirror canon

The mirror canon (also called a canon by contrary motion) is a type of canon which involves the leading voice being played alongside its own inversion (i.e. upside-down). The realisation from the 'closed' (unrealised) form can be affected by placing the page in front of a mirror, thus upside down, and beginning with the already progressing first voice.

The Canon a 2 'Quaerendo invenietis' from J. S. Bach's The Musical Offering, BWV 1079, is a fine example of the process. In its original closed form, the alto clef and an upside-down bass clef indicate both the mirror procedure and the appropriate pitches of the voices for the purpose of realisation.

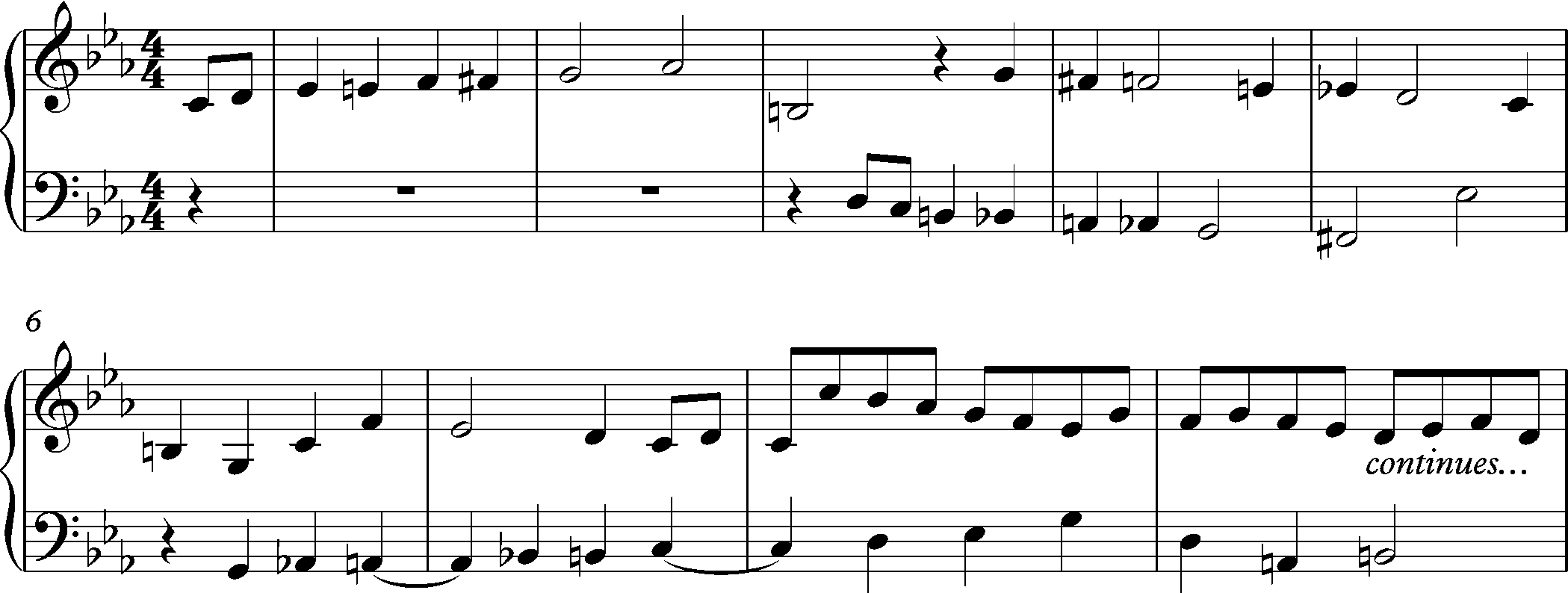
Bach: Canon a 2 'Quaerendo invenietis' from the Musical Offering

A spectacular example of contrapuntal ingenuity can be found in the double canon that forms the trio section of Mozart's Serenade for Wind Octet in C, K. 388. Here a pair of oboes and a pair of bassoons unfold two mirror canons at the same time. Erik Smith sees this as "a perfect example of Mozart's use of academic means, canon, inverted canon and mirror canon, to a purely musical and emotional end". Smith compares the mirror canons here to "the visual image of two swans reflected in the still water."

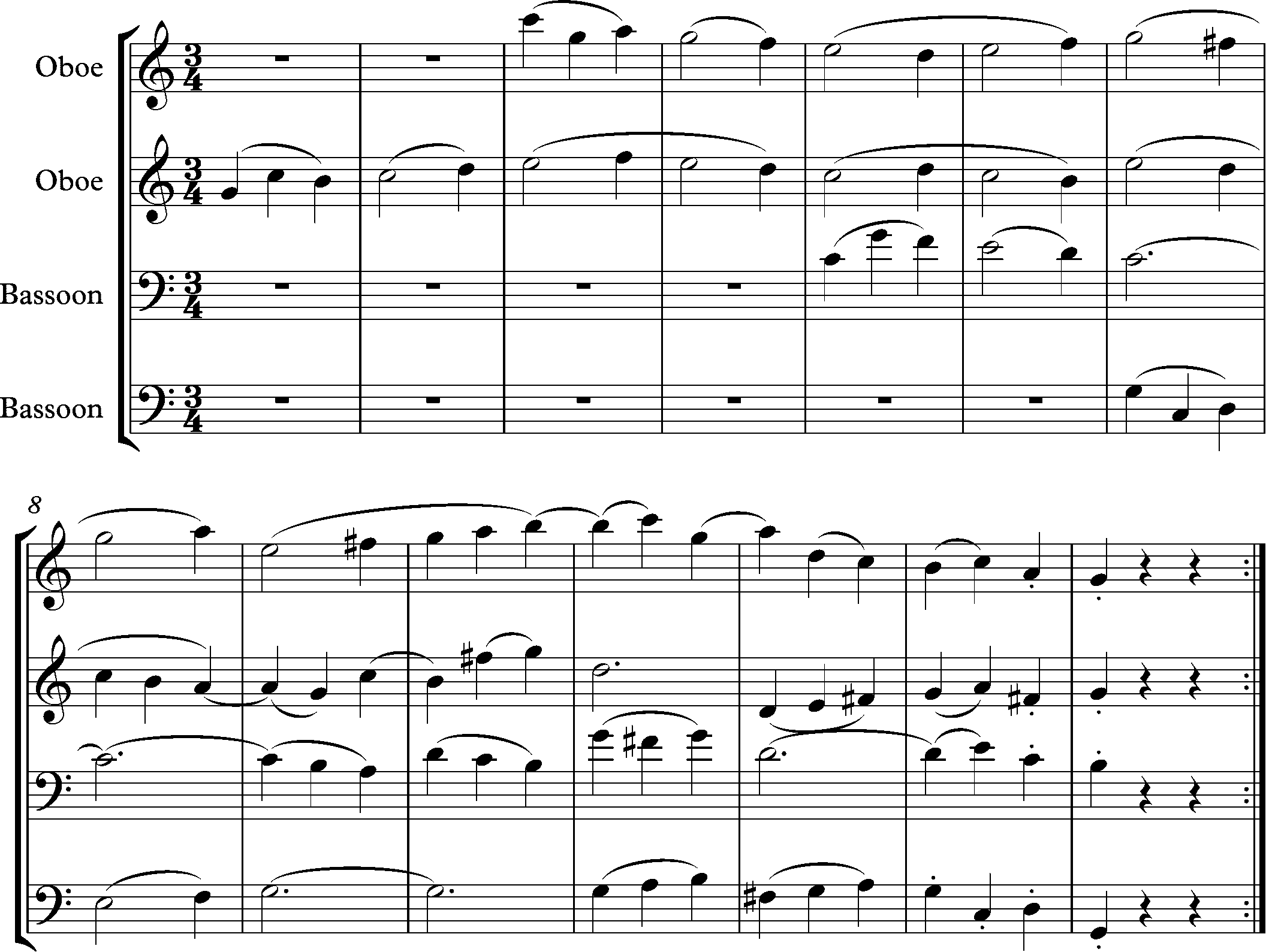
Mozart: Trio from Wind Serenade K. 389

Anton Webern made much use of mirror canons in his later works. According to Richard Taruskin, the first movement of Webern's Symphony, Op. 21 (1927–1928) "consists of three elaborately worked out double canons that pit two prime forms against two inversions". The texture of the first movement unfolds through constantly changing orchestration (see Klangfarbenmelodie), that leads Taruskin to conclude that "Webern was not interested in having his canons perceived by the listener as coherent lines. Instead they are absorbed into a kaleidoscopically fragmented texture that has often been compared to a painterly technique known as pointillism.”

== See also ==
- Mirror fugue
