= Moldenhauer Archives =

Library of Congress collection

Coordinates: 38.8878°N 77.0039°W

The Moldenhauer Archives Library of Congress
- Location: nine locations worldwide
- Established: 1987

Collection
- Size: 3600 items of printed and manuscript music and related documents

Access and use
- Circulation: Library does not publicly circulate

Other information

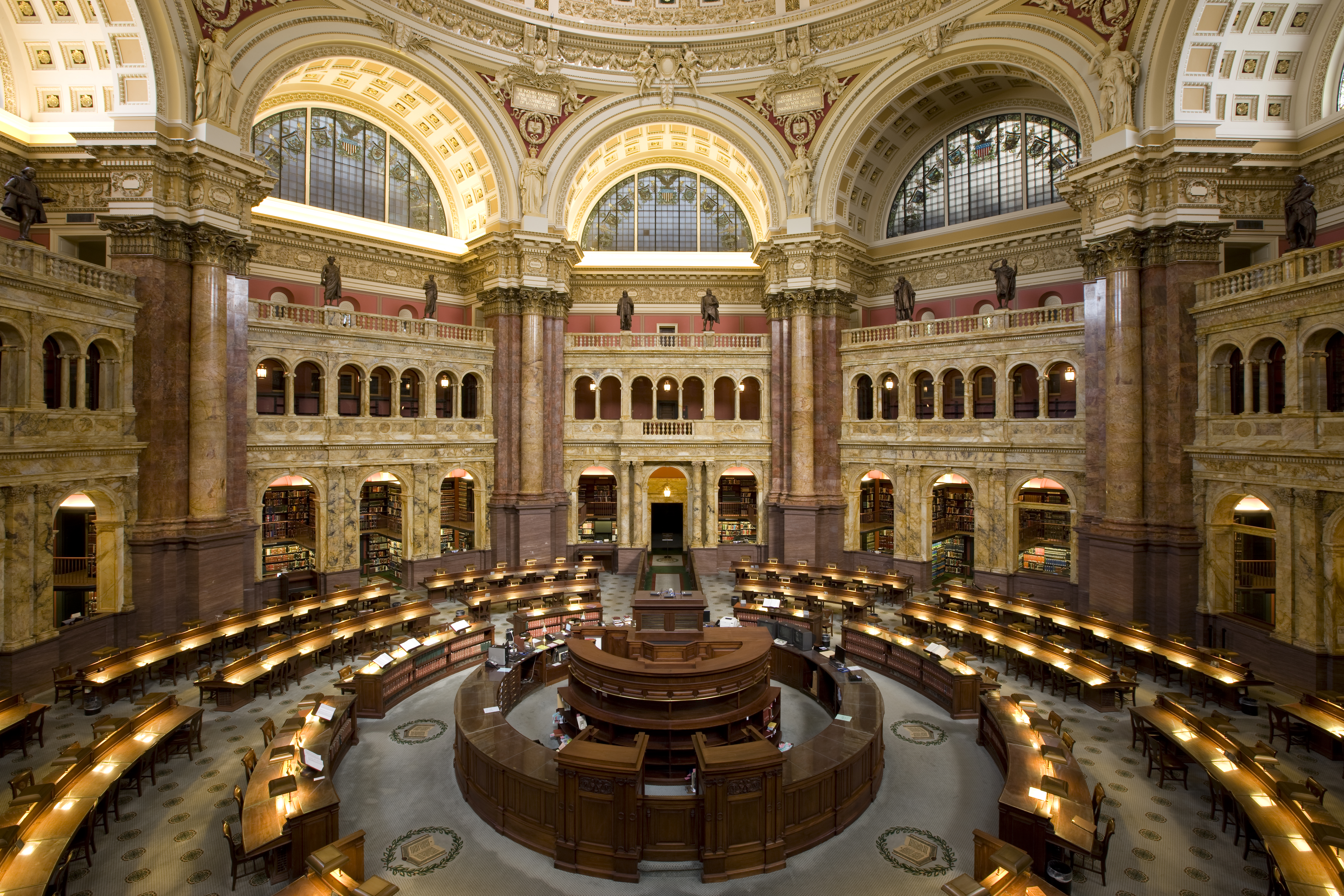
Library of Congress Main Reading Room

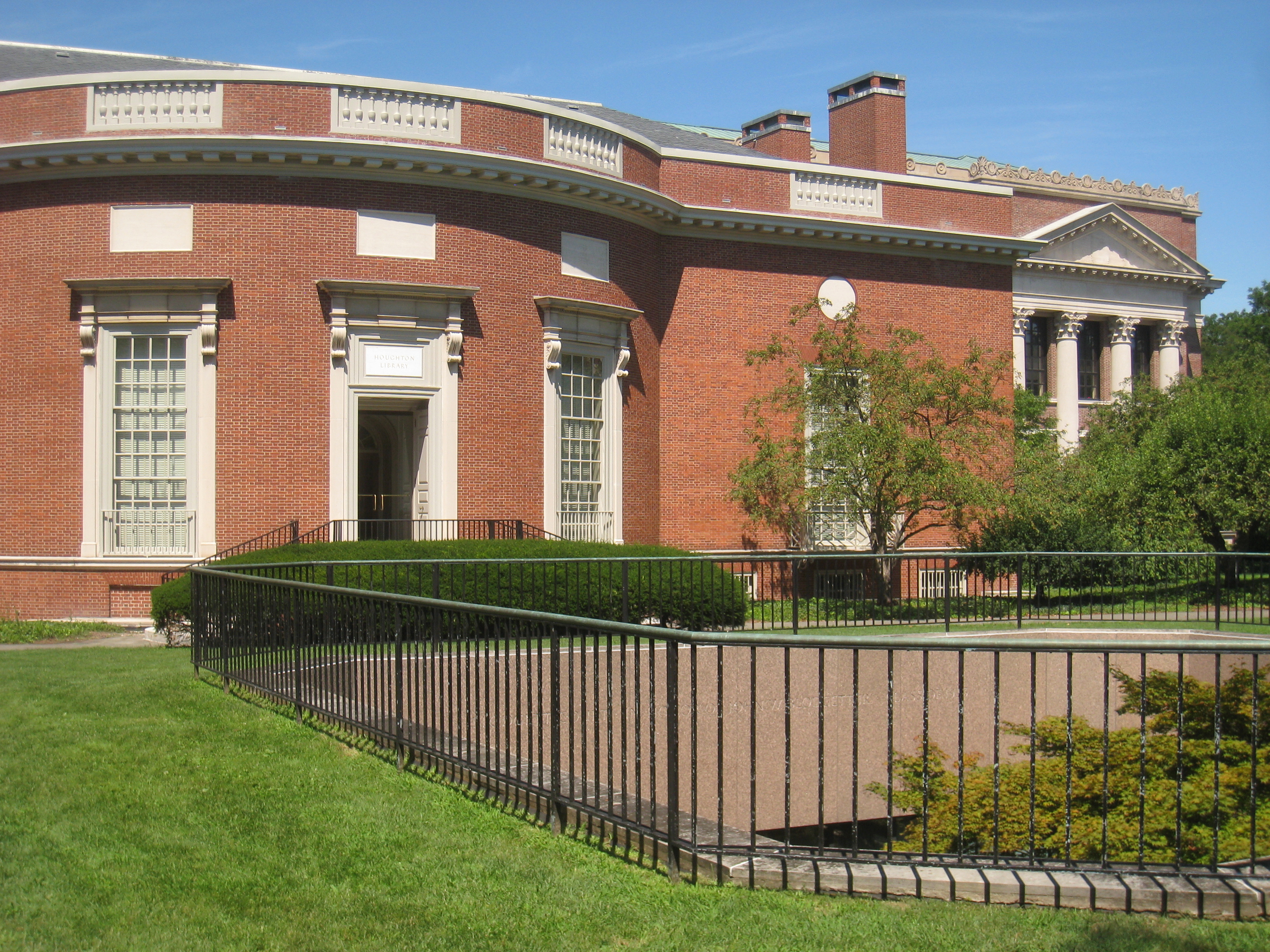
Houghton Library is the primary repository for rare books and manuscripts at Harvard University and houses the Gutenberg Bible and other unique books and documents.

The Moldenhauer Archives at the Library of Congress is a collection of original music, unique documents and manuscripts within the Library of Congress, the national library of the United States. While it contains many thousands of unique original documents of historical significance, it is only a portion of the original Modenhauer Archive that was located in Spokane, Washington and founded and collected by musicologist Hans Moldenhauer. Moldenhauer bequeathed his archive upon his death in 1987 to several libraries internationally with the largest portion being donated to the library at Northwestern University which is considerably larger than the collection at the Library of Congress. Other institutions to receive parts of the collection included the Houghton Library at Harvard University, the Austrian National Library in Vienna, and the Bavarian State Library in Munich among many others. Moldenhauer's very large collection of original manuscripts by Anton Webern, considered to be the most important holding, are now in the Paul-Sacher-Stiftung Library in Basel, Switzerland.

== Significance ==
The archives were founded through a donation of documents and funds by the German collector, historian and musicologist Hans Moldenhauer, in honour of his wife Rosaleen Moldenhauer. The original archive constituted the most comprehensive collection of original musical manuscripts ever accumulated. The collection spans musical periods from the Middle Ages through the 20th century, and includes original musical manuscripts by 57 of the foremost western composers, from Bach, Bartók, Beethoven and Brahms, via Mahler, Mendelssohn and Mozart, to Schubert, Schoenberg and Webern.

Since 1987, the Moldenhauer Archives have grown to many thousands of items that are now housed in nine institutions around the world: in the United States, at the Library of Congress, Harvard University, Northwestern University, Washington State University, and Whitworth College; in Basel, Switzerland, at the Paul Sacher Foundation; in Zürich, Switzerland, at the Zentralbibliothek; in Munich, Germany, at the Bayerische Staatsbibliothek; and in Vienna, Austria, at the Stadtarchiv und Oesterreichische Nationalbibliothek. The Library of Congress portion of the collection contains 3,500 items. The largest holding is at Northwestern University.

== About the benefactor ==
Hans Moldenhauer was born in 1906 in Germany, but emigrated to the United States in 1938 to escape fascism in his native country. He lived and worked in the United States until his death in 1987.

== Literature ==
- John Y. Cole: Encyclopedia of The Library of Congress. Washington, D.C. 2004. ISBN 0-89059-971-8
- Jon Newsom, Alfred Mann: The Rosaleen Moldenhauer Memorial: Music History from Primary Sources : a Guide to the Moldenhauer Archives. Washington, D.C. 2000, Library of Congress. ISBN 0-8444-0987-1
