= Konstantinov =

Konstantinov (Bulgarian: Константинов, Russian: Константинов also transliterated as Konstantinoff, Constantinoff or Constantinov) and Konstantinova (feminine; Константинова) is a common Slavic surname that is derived from the baptismal name Konstantin and literally means Konstantin's.

People with this surname include:

Male

- Aleko Konstantinov (1863–1897), Bulgarian writer
- Alexander Konstantinov (1895–1945), Soviet inventor and scientist in the field of radiophysics
- Anatoly Konstantinov (1923–2006), Soviet aircraft pilot and Hero of the Soviet Union
- Boris Konstantinov (1910–1969), Soviet physicist, academician, and Hero of Socialist Labor
- Dmitri Constantinov (born 1952), Moldovan politician and businessman
- Evgeny Konstantinov (born 1981), Russian ice hockey player
- Fyodor Konstantinov (1901–?), Soviet philosopher and academician
- Julian Konstantinov (born 1966), Bulgarian operatic bass
- Konstantin Konstantinov (1817 or 1819–1871), Russian scientist in the field of artillery, rocketry, instrument making, and automatics
- Kosev Dimitr Konstantinov (1904–1996), Bulgarian historian and academician
- Kostia Konstantinoff (1903–1947), Russian composer and pianist
- Mikhail Konstantinov (1900–1990), Soviet general
- Mikhail Sergeevich Konstantinov (1904–1982), Russian composer, conductor and singer
- Minkov Svetoslav Konstantinov (1902–1966), Bulgarian writer
- Nikolay Konstantinov (1932–2021), Russian mathematics educator
- Plamen Konstantinov (born 1973), Bulgarian volleyball player
- Pyotr Konstantinov (1899–?), Soviet actor and People's Artist of the USSR
- Pyotr Konstantinov (1877–1959), Soviet plant-breeder, selectionist, and academician
- Vitali Konstantinov (born 1963), German artist and book illustrator
- Vladimir Konstantinov (1921–1979), Soviet aircraft pilot and Hero of the Soviet Union
- Vladimir Konstantinov (born 1956), Crimean and Russian politician
- Vladimir Konstantinov (born 1967), former Russian professional hockey player
- Vsevolod Konstantinov (born 1975), Russian psychologist

Female

- Ina Konstantinova (1924–1944), Soviet World War II partisan and diarist
- Galina Konstantinova (born 1940), Russian rower
- Kseniya Konstantinova (1925–1943), Soviet nurse and Hero of the Soviet Union
- Tamara Konstantinova (1919–1999), Soviet ground attack pilot and Hero of the Soviet Union
- Fadel Emanouil Konstantinov (1995) Bulgarian financier and athlete.

== See also ==
- Konstantinov, a crater on the Moon, named after Konstantin Konstantinov
- Konstantinov Kamen, a mountain in the Urals
- Konstantinovsky (disambiguation)
- Konstantinovka (disambiguation)
