= Konstantin =

- Pronunciation: Russian: [kənstɐnʲˈtʲin]
- Gender: Male

Origin
- Origin: Latin
- Meaning: "constant, steadfast"

Other names
- Nicknames: Costel, Costin, Konsti, Konsta, Konse, Kosti, Kosta, Kostya
- Derived: Constantinus
- Related names: Constantinus, Constantine, Konstantine, Kostandin

Konstantin (Cyrillic: Константин) is a given name and sometimes a surname. It is used in some European languages, such as Bulgarian, Russian, Estonian, and German.

== Origin and meanings ==
"Konstantin" is derived from the Latin name Constantinus (Constantine).

As a Christian given name, it refers to the memory of the Roman emperor Constantine the Great. A number of notable persons in the Byzantine Empire, and (via mediation by the Christian Eastern Orthodox Church) in Russian history and earlier East Slavic history are often referred to by this name.

"Konstantin" means "constant" or "steadfast".

There are variations of the name throughout European cultures:

- Константин (Konstantin) in Russian (diminutive Костя/Kostya), Bulgarian (diminutives Косьо/Kosyo, Коце/Kotse) and Serbian
- Костянтин (Kostiantyn) in Ukrainian (diminutive Костя/Kostya/Kostia)
- Канстанцін (Kanstantsin) in Belarusian
- Konstantinas in Lithuanian
- Konstantīns in Latvian
- Konstanty in Polish (diminutive Kostek)
- Constantin in Romanian (diminutive Costel), French
- Constantino in Spanish
- Konstandin/Konstantin in Albania (usually among Orthodox people)
- Konštantín in Slovak
- Κωνσταντῖνος (Kōnstantînos) in Greek (diminutives include Kostas, Kostakis, Kostîs, Ntînos, Dînos)
- Consaidín (Considine) in Irish
- Còiseam in Scottish Gaelic
- კოტე (Kote) in Georgian

== People ==
People bearing the name Konstantin include:

=== Given name ===
- Konstantin of Rostov (1186–1218), Grand Prince of Vladimir
- Konstantin Aleksa (born 2007), Austrian footballer
- Konstantin Chernenko (1911–1985), Soviet politician, General Secretary of the Communist Party
- Konstantin Ghilian Karl d'Aspré (1754–1809), Austrian general
- Konstantin Dobrev (born 1974), Bulgarian badminton player
- Konstantin Ernst, Russian media manager, producer and TV host
- Konstantin Feoktistov (1926–2009), Soviet cosmonaut
- Konstantin Grigorishin (born 1965), Ukrainian billionaire businessman
- Konstanty Kalinowski (1838–1864), 19th-century revolutionary who was one of the leaders of the January Uprising in Congress Poland
- Konstantin Khanin, Russian mathematician
- Konstantin Kisin, British comedian and podcaster
- Konstantin Klein (born 1991), German basketball player
- Konstantin Koltsov, Belarusian hockey player (1981–2024)
- Konstantin Konik (1873–1936), Estonian politician and surgeon
- Konstantin Korovin (1861–1939), Russian painter
- Konstantin Kravchuk (born 1985), Russian tennis player
- Konstantin Krizhevsky (1926–2000), Russian footballer
- Konstantin Leontiev (1831–1891), Russian philosopher
- Konstantin Märska (1896–1951), Estonian cinematographer
- Konstantin Mihailović Serbian soldier and author of a memoir of his time as a Janissary in the army of the Ottoman Empire
- Konstantin Nahk (born 1975), Estonian football player
- Konstantin von Neurath (1873–1956), German diplomat
- Konstantin Päts (1874–1956), Estonian politician, first President of Estonia
- Konstantin Petrzhak (1907-1998), Soviet physicist
- Konstantin Pott (born 1997), German politician
- Konstantin Pysin (1910–1984), Soviet politician
- Konstantin Ramul (1879–1975), Estonian psychologist
- Konstantin Rodzaevsky (1907-1946), The leader of the Russian Fascist Party
- Konstantin Rokossovsky (1896-1968), Marshal of the Soviet Union
- Konstantin Romanov (disambiguation)
  - Konstantin Romanov (ice hockey) (born 1985), Russian-Kazakh ice hockey player
  - Grand Duke Constantine Pavlovich of Russia (1779–1831), grand duke of Russia, son of Paul I
  - Grand Duke Konstantin Nikolayevich of Russia (1827–1892), grand duke of Russia, son of Nicholas I
  - Grand Duke Konstantin Konstantinovich of Russia (1858–1915), grand duke of Russia, grandson of Nicholas I, famous Russian poet
  - Prince Constantine Constantinovich of Russia (1891–1918), prince of Russia
- Konstantin Rudnev (1911–1980), Soviet politician
- Konstantin Sats (born 1982), Russian alpine skier
- Konstantin Sheberstov (1919–1953), Soviet fighter pilot
- Konstantin Shvedchikov (1884–1952), Soviet official
- Konstantin Stanislavsky (1863–1938), Russian actor and theater director
- Konstantin Tsiolkovsky (1857–1935), Russian and Soviet rocket scientist and pioneer of the astronautic theory
- Konstantín Alexeyevich Vasilyev (1942–1976), Russian illustrator
- Konstantin Vassiljev (born 1984), Estonian football player
- Konstantin Wecker (born 1947), German singer-songwriter

=== Surname ===
- Knyaz Konstantin (disambiguation)
- Leopoldine Konstantin (1886–1965), Austrian actress
- Stefan Konstantin (1282–1322), King of the Serbian Kingdom

== Fictional characters ==
- Konstantin Levin, fictional character in Leo Tolstoy's Anna Karenina
- Konstantin Gavrilovich Treplev, fictional character in Anton Chekhov's play The Seagull
- Konstantin, fictional character in Codename Villanelle (2018 novel) and Killing Eve (2018—2022 television show)

== See also ==
- Konstantine
- Constantin
- Konstantinov
- Konstantinovsk
- Konstantinovsky (disambiguation)
- Konstantinovka (disambiguation)
