= Konstantīns =

Male given name

- Gender: Male
- Name day: 11 March

Origin
- Origin: Derived from the Latin name Constantinus
- Region of origin: Latvia

Other names
- Related names: Constantinus, Constantine, Konstantin, Konstantinos, Kostandin

Konstantīns is a Latvian masculine given name. Individuals bearing the name Konstantīns include:

- Konstantīns Calko (born 1994), racing driver
- Konstantīns Igošins (born 1971), footballer
- Konstantīns Konstantinovs (born 1978), powerlifter
- Konstantīns Ovčiņņikovs (born 1983), Russian-Latvian judoka
- Konstantīns Pēkšēns (1859—1928), architect
- Konstantīns Raudive (1909—1974), writer and intellectual
