= Constantine (name) =

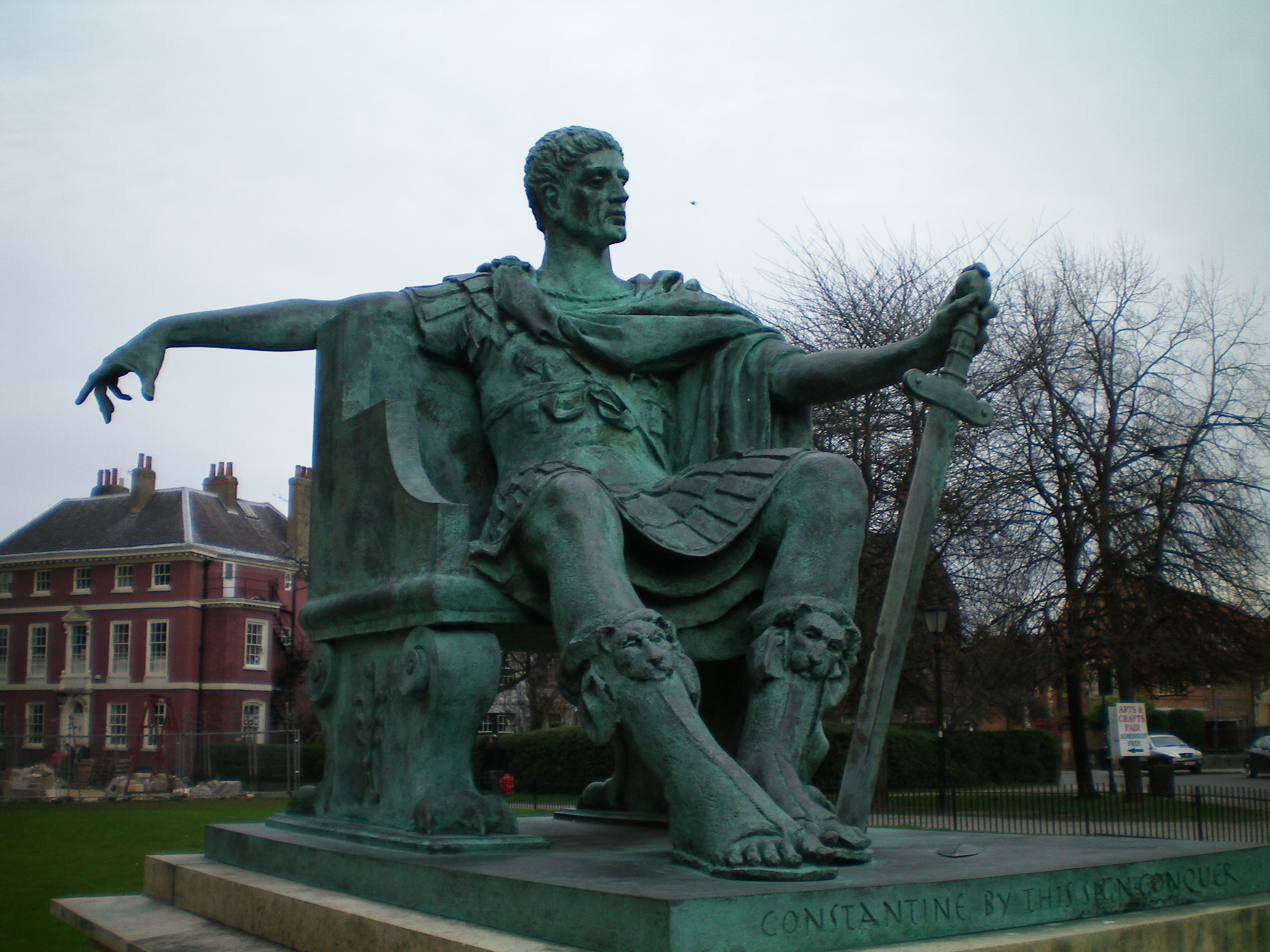
- statue of Constantine I in York.
- Gender: Unisex (primarily male)

Origin
- Origin: Latin

Other names
- Related names: Constantinus, Konstantine, Konstantin, Konstantinos, Kostentinos, Kostandin

Constantine (/ˈkɒnstəntaɪn/ or /ˈkɒnstəntiːn/; Latin: Cōnstantīnus, Greek: Κωνσταντῖνος, Kōnstantînos) is a masculine and feminine (in French for example) given name and surname which is derived from the Latin name Constantinus, a hypocoristic of the first names Constans and Constantius, both meaning "constant, steadfast" in Latin. The popularity stems from the thirteen Roman and Byzantine emperors, beginning with Constantine the Great.

The names are the Latin equivalents of the Bulgarian name 'Костадин' and the Greek name Eustáthios (Εὐστάθιος), meaning the same, not changing, standing. The name "Constantine" is a name in Greece and Cyprus, the forms Κώστας (Kostas), Κωστής (Kostis) and Ντίνος (Dinos) being popular hypocoristics. Costel is a common Romanian form, a diminutive of Constantin. The Bulgarian, Russian and Serbian form is Konstantin (Константин), and their short forms Kostya and Kosta, respectively. The Ukrainian form of the name is Kostyantyn (Костянтин). The name is common among Eastern Orthodox people in Albania, in the form of Kostandin, Kostantin or Kosta. The name is also found in other languages of Western Europe such as Considine in Irish, Constantijn in Dutch or Còiseam in Scottish Gaelic.

== Constantine or Constantin as a surname ==
- Adrian Constantin (born 1970), Romanian mathematician
- Bernie Constantin (1947–2025), Swiss songwriter and radio show host
- Con Constantine (born 1945), Cypriot-Australian businessman
- Dow Constantine (born 1961), American lawyer, urban planner and politician
- Eddie Constantine (1913–1993), French actor and singer
- George Constantin (1933–1994), Romanian actor
- George Constantine (priest) (c.1500–1560), British Protestant reformer
- George Hamilton Constantine (1878–1967), British painter
- George Baxandall Constantine (1902–1969), Pakistani jurist
- George Constantine (racing driver) (1918–1968), American race car driver
- Irv Constantine (1907–1966), American football player
- Jean Constantin (songwriter) (1923–1997), French singer, songwriter and composer
- Jean Constantin (1927–2010), Romanian actor
- Kevin Constantine (born 1958), American ice hockey coach
- Larry Constantine (born 1943), American software engineer
- Learie Constantine (1901–1971), Trinidadian cricketer, lawyer and politician
- Michael Constantine (1927–2021), American actor
- Savet Constantine, American politician
- Storm Constantine (1956–2021), British science-fiction and fantasy author
- Susannah Constantine (born 1962), English fashion designer and style advisor
- Thomas A. Constantine (1938–2015), American administrator of the Drug Enforcement Administration

== Constantine as a given name ==
See: List of articles with forename Constantine

- Constantine I of Greece
- Constantine II of Greece
- Constantine I, king of the Picts and was considered the third king of Scotland
- Constantine II of Scotland
- Constantine III of Scotland
- Constantin Agiu, Romanian politician
- Constantin Alajalov
- Constantine Andreou
- Constantin Angelescu
- Constantin Anghelache
- Constantin Anton
- Constantin Antoniade
- Constantin Antoniades, Swiss fencer
- Constantin Argetoianu
- Constantin C. Arion
- Constantine Walter Benson
- Constantin Bosianu
- Constantin Brăiloiu
- Constantin N. Brăiloiu
- Constantin Brâncuși, Romanian-born sculptor who made his career in France
- Constantine Bruno, Baron Kervyn de Lettenhove
- Constantine W. Buckley
- Constantin Budeanu
- Constantin Cantacuzino, several people
- Constantine P. Cavafy
- Constantin Climescu
- Constantin Costăchescu
- Constantin A. Kretzulescu
- Constantin Cristescu
- Constantine "Cus" D'Amato (1908–1985), Italian-American boxing manager and trainer
- Constantin Dimitrescu
- Constantin Dimitrescu-Iași
- Constantine Doukas, Byzantine general and politician
- Constantine Dragaš (>1355–1395), Serbian ruler
- Constantin Eftimiu
- Constantin Eraclide
- Constantin Frosin
- Constantin Grecescu, Romanian long-distance runner
- Constantine Hering (1800-1880), German-born, American physician
- Constantin Iancovescu
- Saint Cleopa Ilie (1912–1998), born Constantin Ilie, Romanian Orthodox abbot of the Sihăstria Monastery and saint
- Constantin Al. Ionescu-Caion
- Constantin Isopescu-Grecul
- Constantin Istrati
- Constantine Kanaris, Greek admiral and statesman
- Konstantin Khabensky, (born 1972), Russian actor of stage and film, director and philanthropist
- Constantin Kirițescu
- Constantine Koukias, Australian classical composer
- Constantine Lascaris
- Constantin Le Paige, Belgian mathematician
- Constantin Lecca
- Constantin Levaditi
- Konstantin Lokhanov (born 1998), Russian junior world champion and Olympic sabre fencer living in the United States
- Constantine Manasses
- Constantine Manetas (born 1980), Greek fencer
- Constantine Maroulis, American rock singer, actor and writer
- Constantin Meissner
- Constantin Miculescu
- Constantin Mihail
- Constantine Mitsotakis, Prime Minister of Greece
- Constantine Richard Moorsom
- Constantin Niță
- Constantin Noe
- Constantine Overton (1626/7-?1690), Quaker leader in Shrewsbury, Shropshire
- Constantine Palaiologos, last Roman Emperor
- Constantine Papadakis, Greek historian
- Constantine Paparrigopoulos
- Konstantin Päts, President of Estonia
- Constantin Petrovicescu
- Constantine Phaulkon
- Constantine Phillips
- Constantine Phipps, 1st Marquess of Normanby
- Constantine Phipps, 2nd Baron Mulgrave
- Constantin Pîrvulescu
- Constantin Popovici, Romanian platform diver
- Constantin Popovici (scholar)
- Gheorghe Constantin Roja
- Konstantin Rokossovsky, Soviet marshal
- Constantine Samuel Rafinesque, French polymath
- Constantin Andreas von Regel
- Constantin Sandu, Moldovan footballer
- Constantin Sandu-Aldea
- Constantine-Silvanus
- Constantine Simitis, Greek Prime Minister
- Constantine Joseph Smyth
- Constantin Sotiropoulos
- Constantine Stilbes
- Constantin T. Stoika
- Constantin C. Teodorescu, Romanian engineer
- Constantin Tobescu
- Constantin Ucuta
- Constantin Vișoianu
- Eskender, Constantine (Kostentinos) II of Ethiopia
- Zara Yaqob, Constantine (Kostentinos) I of Ethiopia

== In popular culture ==
- John Constantine, DC Comics character from the Hellblazer series
  - Constantine (film), film based on the DC Comics character
  - Constantine (TV series), TV show based on the DC Comics character
- Stavros Constantine, fictional character in Murder on the Orient Express

== See also ==
- Constantin
- Konstantine
