= Konstantinovka, Russia =

Konstantinovka (Russian: Константи́новка) is the name of several rural localities in Russia.

== Altai Krai ==
As of 2010, one rural locality in Altai Krai bears this name:

- Konstantinovka, Altai Krai, a selo in Konstantinovsky Selsoviet of Kulundinsky District

== Amur Oblast ==
As of 2010, one rural locality in Amur Oblast bears this name:

- Konstantinovka, Amur Oblast, a selo in Konstantinovsky Rural Settlement of Konstantinovsky District

== Republic of Bashkortostan ==
As of 2010, two rural localities in the Republic of Bashkortostan bear this name:

- Konstantinovka, Karmaskalinsky District, Republic of Bashkortostan, a village in Nikolayevsky Selsoviet of Karmaskalinsky District
- Konstantinovka, Tuymazinsky District, Republic of Bashkortostan, a selo in Nikolayevsky Selsoviet of Tuymazinsky District

== Irkutsk Oblast ==
As of 2010, one rural locality in Irkutsk Oblast bears this name:

- Konstantinovka, Irkutsk Oblast, a village in Zhigalovsky District

== Kaliningrad Oblast ==
As of 2010, two rural localities in Kaliningrad Oblast bear this name:

- Konstantinovka, Guryevsky District, Kaliningrad Oblast, a settlement in Dobrinsky Rural Okrug of Guryevsky District
- Konstantinovka, Ozyorsky District, Kaliningrad Oblast, a settlement in Krasnoyarsky Rural Okrug of Ozyorsky District

== Kaluga Oblast ==
As of 2010, one rural locality in Kaluga Oblast bears this name:

- Konstantinovka, Kaluga Oblast, a village in Peremyshlsky District

== Kemerovo Oblast ==
As of 2010, one rural locality in Kemerovo Oblast bears this name:

- Konstantinovka, Kemerovo Oblast, a village in Pervomayskaya Rural Territory of Mariinsky District

== Khabarovsk Krai ==
As of 2010, two rural localities in Khabarovsk Krai bear this name:

- Konstantinovka, Khabarovsky District, Khabarovsk Krai, a selo in Khabarovsky District
- Konstantinovka, Nikolayevsky District, Khabarovsk Krai, a selo in Nikolayevsky District

== Kirov Oblast ==
As of 2010, one rural locality in Kirov Oblast bears this name:

- Konstantinovka, Kirov Oblast, a selo in Konstantinovsky Rural Okrug of Malmyzhsky District

== Komi Republic ==
As of 2010, one rural locality in the Komi Republic bears this name:

- Konstantinovka, Komi Republic, a village in Izhma Selo Administrative Territory of Izhemsky District

== Kursk Oblast ==
As of 2010, two rural localities in Kursk Oblast bear this name:

- Konstantinovka, Medvensky District, Kursk Oblast, a village in Vysoksky Selsoviet of Medvensky District
- Konstantinovka, Sovetsky District, Kursk Oblast, a village in Sovetsky Selsoviet of Sovetsky District

== Republic of Mordovia ==
As of 2010, one rural locality in the Republic of Mordovia bears this name:

- Konstantinovka, Republic of Mordovia, a selo in Konstantinovsky Selsoviet of Romodanovsky District

== Nizhny Novgorod Oblast ==
As of 2010, two rural localities in Nizhny Novgorod Oblast bear this name:

- Konstantinovka, Knyagininsky District, Nizhny Novgorod Oblast, a village in Vozrozhdensky Selsoviet of Knyagininsky District
- Konstantinovka, Pochinkovsky District, Nizhny Novgorod Oblast, a selo in Naruksovsky Selsoviet of Pochinkovsky District

== Novosibirsk Oblast ==
As of 2010, two rural localities in Novosibirsk Oblast bear this name:

- Konstantinovka, Kuybyshevsky District, Novosibirsk Oblast, a village in Kuybyshevsky District
- Konstantinovka, Tatarsky District, Novosibirsk Oblast, a selo in Tatarsky District

== Omsk Oblast ==
As of 2010, one rural locality in Omsk Oblast bears this name:

- Konstantinovka, Omsk Oblast, a village in Utinsky Rural Okrug of Nazyvayevsky District

== Orenburg Oblast ==
As of 2010, one rural locality in Orenburg Oblast bears this name:

- Konstantinovka, Orenburg Oblast, a selo in Konstantinovsky Selsoviet of Sharlyksky District

== Oryol Oblast ==
As of 2010, two rural localities in Oryol Oblast bear this name:

- Konstantinovka, Mtsensky District, Oryol Oblast, a village in Voinsky Selsoviet of Mtsensky District
- Konstantinovka, Sverdlovsky District, Oryol Oblast, a village in Kotovsky Selsoviet of Sverdlovsky District

== Penza Oblast ==
As of 2010, two rural localities in Penza Oblast bear this name:

- Konstantinovka, Penzensky District, Penza Oblast, a selo in Salovsky Selsoviet of Penzensky District
- Konstantinovka, Serdobsky District, Penza Oblast, a village in Dolgorukovsky Selsoviet of Serdobsky District

== Perm Krai ==
As of 2010, two rural localities in Perm Krai bear this name:

- Konstantinovka, Dobryanka, Perm Krai, a village under the administrative jurisdiction of the city of krai significance of Dobryanka
- Konstantinovka, Bardymsky District, Perm Krai, a selo in Bardymsky District

== Primorsky Krai ==
As of 2010, two rural localities in Primorsky Krai bear this name:

- Konstantinovka, Oktyabrsky District, Primorsky Krai, a selo in Oktyabrsky District
- Konstantinovka, Spassky District, Primorsky Krai, a selo in Spassky District

== Ryazan Oblast ==
As of 2010, four rural localities in Ryazan Oblast bear this name:

- Konstantinovka, Korablinsky District, Ryazan Oblast, a village in Nikolayevsky Rural Okrug of Korablinsky District
- Konstantinovka, Alexandro-Nevsky District, Ryazan Oblast, a village in Leninsky Rural Okrug of Alexandro-Nevsky District
- Konstantinovka, Sarayevsky District, Ryazan Oblast, a village in Alexeyevsky Rural Okrug of Sarayevsky District
- Konstantinovka, Shilovsky District, Ryazan Oblast, a village in Borovsky Rural Okrug of Shilovsky District

== Samara Oblast ==
As of 2010, two rural localities in Samara Oblast bear this name:

- Konstantinovka, Bolsheglushitsky District, Samara Oblast, a selo in Bolsheglushitsky District
- Konstantinovka, Yelkhovsky District, Samara Oblast, a village in Yelkhovsky District

== Saratov Oblast ==
As of 2010, three rural localities in Saratov Oblast bear this name:

- Konstantinovka, Krasnokutsky District, Saratov Oblast, a selo in Krasnokutsky District
- Konstantinovka, Saratovsky District, Saratov Oblast, a selo in Saratovsky District
- Konstantinovka, Tatishchevsky District, Saratov Oblast, a village in Tatishchevsky District

== Tambov Oblast ==
As of 2010, one rural locality in Tambov Oblast bears this name:

- Konstantinovka, Tambov Oblast, a village in Bolshesheremetyevsky Selsoviet of Pichayevsky District

== Republic of Tatarstan ==
As of 2010, two rural localities in the Republic of Tatarstan bear this name:

- Konstantinovka, Aznakayevsky District, Republic of Tatarstan, a village in Aznakayevsky District
- Konstantinovka, Vysokogorsky District, Republic of Tatarstan, a selo in Vysokogorsky District
