= Kosta =

Kosta may refer to:

== People ==
- Kosta (given name), a list of people with the given name or nickname
- Kosta (surname), a list of people

== Places ==
- Kosta, Estonia, a village
- Kosta, Greece, a community
- Kosta, Sweden, a village

== Other uses ==
- Kosta Boda, a glassworks in Sweden
- Kosta (architectural feature), in Hindu temples

== See also ==
- Costa (disambiguation)
- Costas (disambiguation)
- Koshta, a Hindu caste
