= List of Greek architects =

This is a list of notable Greek architects in alphabetical order:

== Modern Greece ==
=== A–Z ===
- Souzana Antonakaki
- Nikolaos Balanos
- Kostas Biris
- Ioannis Despotopoulos
- Constantinos Apostolou Doxiadis
- Patroklos Karantinos
- Stamatios Kleanthis
- Aris Konstantinidis
- Anastasios Metaxas
- Anastasios Orlandos
- Xenophon Paionidis
- Tician Papachristou
- Dimitris Pikionis
- Pericles A. Sakellarios
- Alexandros Tombazis
- Stamatis Voulgaris
- Elia Zenghelis

== See also ==
- List of architects
- List of Greeks
