= Anna Yegorova =

Soviet female air force officer

- Анна Александровна Тимофеева-Егорова
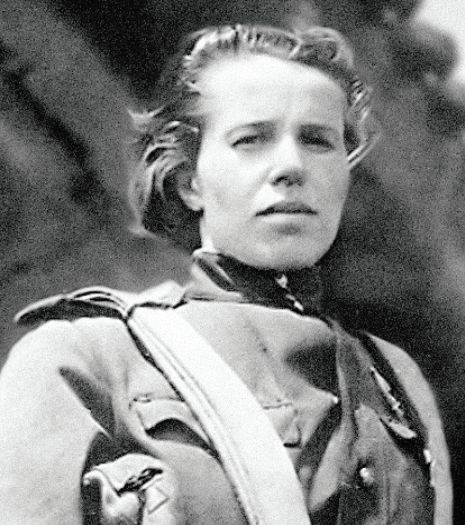
- Born: 23 September 1916; Volodovo village, Tver Governorate, Russian Empire
- Died: 29 October 2009 (aged 93); Moscow, Russian Federation
- Military career
- Allegiance: Soviet Union
- Branch: Soviet Air Force
- Service years: 1941–1945
- Rank: Senior Lieutenant
- Units: 130th Air Liaison Squadron (1941–1942); 805th Attack Aviation Regiment (1943–1944)
- Awards: Hero of the Soviet Union

Anna Alexandrovna Timofeyeva-Yegorova (Russian: Анна Александровна Тимофеева-Егорова; 23 September 1916 – 29 October 2009) was a pilot in the Soviet Air Force during the Second World War. She flew a total of 277 sorties that included liaison, reconnaissance and ground-attack missions before she became a prisoner-of-war when her Il-2 was shot down. She was awarded the title of Hero of the Soviet Union in 1965.

== Early years ==
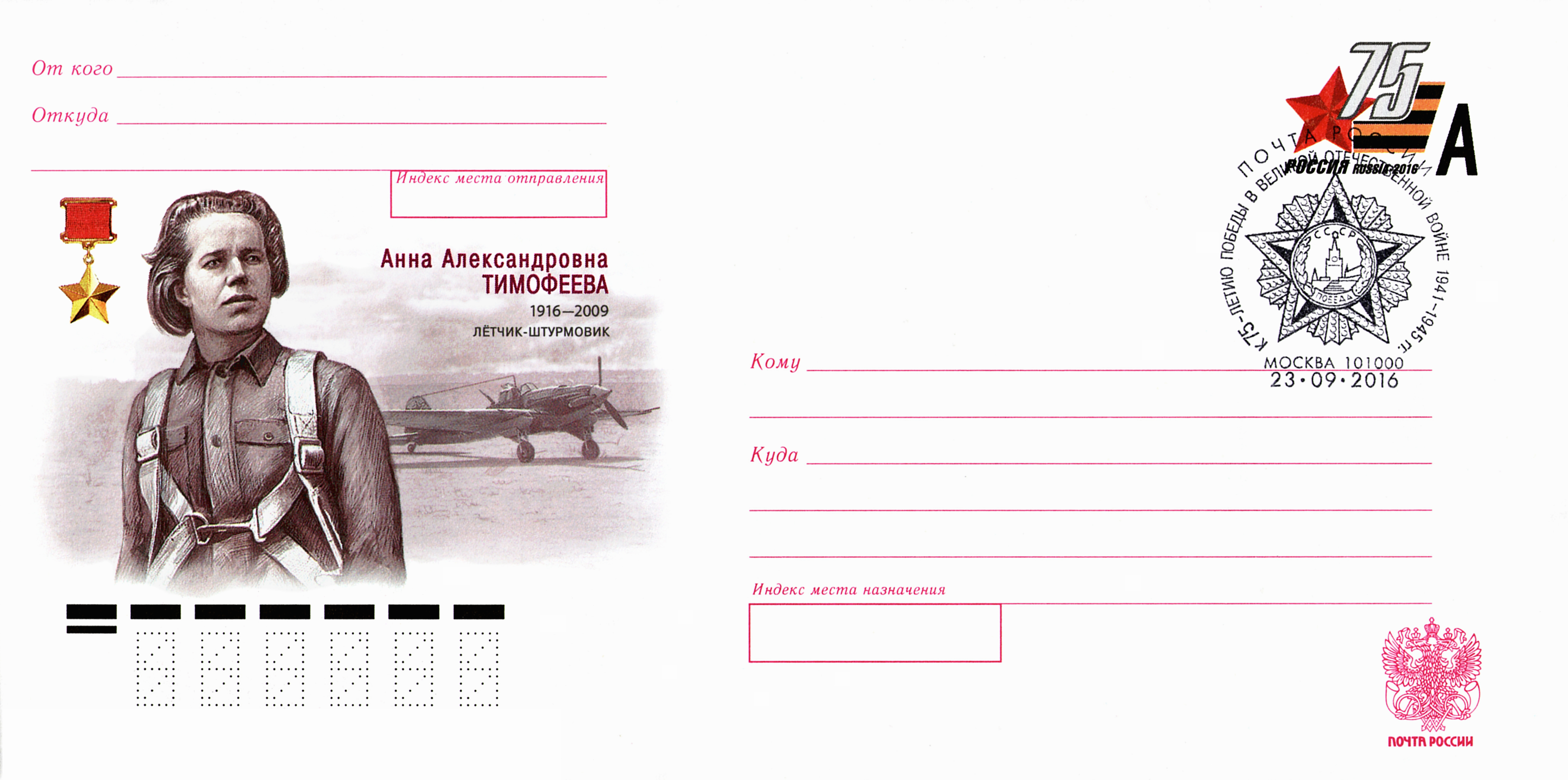
A postal stationery envelope issued to commemorate the 100th birth anniversary of Anna Yegorova (Timofeeva). Post of Russia, 2016.

Anna Yegorova was born into a peasant family in the village Volodovo (now in Tver Oblast). Eight of her fifteen siblings died when they were infants. Her father, Aleksandr Yegorov, fought in the First World War as well as the Russian Civil War as a Bolshevist. Combat stress and other hardships deteriorated his health, and in 1925 he died at 49 years of age.

After seven years of school, Yegorova joined Mosmetrostroy, where she worked as a steelman, and then as a tiler on the construction of Krasnye Vorota station. Her construction job allowed her to study at the Mosmetrostroy aeroclub.

In 1938, she was recommended to attend the Ulyanovsk flight school, but was soon expelled due to her brother's arrest as an "enemy of the people".

After her expulsion, Yegorova worked as a bookkeeper's assistant at a weaving factory in Smolensk, while tutoring members of the factory's aero club. She was then sent to attend the Kherson flight school, which she graduated from in 1939. Soon afterward, Yegorova became a flight instructor for the Kalinin municipal aero club.

== Military career ==
After the start of Operation Barbarossa, the invasion of the USSR by Germany, Yegorova volunteered for combat service. From 1941 to 1942, Yegorova flew 236 reconnaissance and delivery missions for the 130th Air Liaison Squadron in a Polikarpov Po-2, and was subsequently awarded the Order of the Red Banner for distinguished service.

After an aircrash, which was determined to be pilot error, Yegorova was transferred to a training air regiment. In 1943, Yegorova was transferred to the 805th Attack Aviation Regiment and flew 41 missions in the Ilyushin Il-2. These missions included the battles above the Taman Peninsula, Crimea, and Poland.

During a mission on 22 August 1944, while in an attack formation of ten aircraft over the Magnuszew bridgehead near Warsaw, Yegorova's plane was hit by anti-aircraft fire. Her gunner, Yevdokiya "Dusya" Alekseyevna Nazarkina was killed in the attack. With her gunner killed, and the plane heavily damaged, Yegorova exited the aircraft while the plane was inverted, and suffered serious thermal burns. Yegorova's parachute only partially opened, and she was seriously wounded again upon landing.

Yegorova was captured by the German Army and taken to a prisoner of war camp where her wounds were treated by Dr. Georgy Sinyakov. Back at her air base, Yegorova was presumed dead and was recommended for the title of Hero of the Soviet Union, but she did not receive the title until 1965.

On 31 January 1945, Soviet forces overran the Küstrin prisoner camp where she was being held. Yegorova was interrogated as a potential traitor for eleven days at an NKVD filtration camp for returning Soviet prisoners. Eventually, she was released from custody, but was discharged into the reserve soon after.

== Postwar ==
After being discharged from the armed forces she married Vyacheslav Timofeev, the commander of her air division, and bore two sons named Pyotr and Igor. She was the subject of a feature article in the Literaturnaya Gazeta in 1961, and in 1965, she was awarded the title of Hero of the Soviet Union.

Yegorova died in Moscow at the age on 93 on 29 October 2009.

== Awards and honors ==
- Hero of the Soviet Union (6 May 1965)
- Order of Lenin (6 May 1965)
- Two Orders of the Red Banner (20 February 1942 and 26 May 1943)
- Two Orders of the Patriotic War 1st class (23 February 1948 and 11 March 1985)
- Medal "For Courage" (4 May 1943)
- Silver Cross of Merit (Poland) (1960)

== See also ==
- List of female Heroes of the Soviet Union
- Lidiya Shulaykina
- Tamara Konstantinova
- Mariya Tolstova
- Lyolya Boguzokova

== Bibliography ==
- Thanks, Annushka // "Soviet Military Review", No. 7 (67), July 1970. pages 39–40
- Cottam, Kazimiera (1998). Women in War and Resistance: Selected Biographies of Soviet Women Soldiers. Nepean, Canada: New Military Publishing. ISBN 0968270220. OCLC 674661411.
- Noggle, Anne (1994). A Dance With Death: Soviet Airwomen in World War II. College Station, TX: Texas A&M University Press. ISBN 0890966028. OCLC 806012748.
- Simonov, Andrey; Chudinova, Svetlana (2017). Женщины - Герои Советского Союза и России. Moscow: Russian Knights Foundation, Museum of Technology V. Zadorozhny. ISBN 9785990960701. OCLC 1019634607.
- Le Chien, Monsieur and Connard, L'Odieux (2021). Le Petit théâtre des opérations. Paris, France: Éditions Audie-Fluide Glacial. ISBN 979-10-382-0083-8. This bande dessinée/graphic novel tells Yegorova's story in partly humorous cartoon style on pp. 23–30.
