= Mariya Tolstova =

Soviet World War II pilot (1918–2004)

Mariya Ilyichina Tolstova
- Мария Ильинична Толстова
- Born: 15 May 1918; Mariinsk
- Died: 8 January 2004 (aged 85); Kolchugino
- Military career
- Allegiance: Soviet Union
- Branch: Soviet Air Force
- Service years: 1942 – 1945
- Rank: Senior Lieutenant
- Unit: 175th Guards Attack Aviation Regiment
- Conflicts: World War II
- Awards: Order of the Red Banner

Mariya Ilyichina Tolstova (Russian: Мария Ильинична Толстова; 15 May 1918 – 8 January 2004) was a flight commander in the 175th Guards Attack Aviation Regiment, and one of the few women to fly the Il-2.

== Civilian life ==
Tolstova was orphaned at a young age, resulting in her attending a boarding school for much of her youth. After completing school she worked at a railway station and later as a schoolteacher before eventually becoming a flight instructor at an aeroclub. After the war she worked for the civil air fleet, flying cargo in a Po-2 until retiring from aviation in 1959.

== World War II ==
Despite her experience as a flight instructor and aviation background, Tolstova volunteered to become a medical officer in order to be sent to the front. She briefly served as a field medic in the 5th Guards Airborne Regiment where she assisted hundreds of wounded soldiers, before her request for a transfer to aviation was granted. Initially she worked as a flight instructor in the 11th separate training regiment, training 36 pilots while doing so, before eventually being posted to the 175th Guards Attack Aviation Regiment in 1944. There, she flew 42 sorties on the Il-2 by the end of the war.

== Awards ==
- Two Order of the Red Banner
- Order of the Patriotic War 2nd class
- Order of the Red Star
- Medal "For Courage"
- campaign and jubilee medals

== See also ==
- Anna Yegorova
- Tamara Konstantinova
- Lidiya Shulaykina
- Lyolya Boguzokova
