= Konstantinos =

- Gender: Male
- Name day: May 21

Origin
- Origin: Greek
- Meaning: Constant, Steadfast

Other names
- Nicknames: Kostas, Kostis, Kosta, Ntinos, Dinos, Tinos, Kon, Costas, Costis, Costa, Con, Gus, Gussie, Gust, Dino, Dean (US), Tino
- Derived: Constantinus
- Related names: Constantinus, Constantine

Konstantinos or Constantinos (Κωνσταντίνος, Konstantínos) is a Greek male given name.

- Konstantinos "Kosta" Barbarouses (born 1990), New Zealand footballer
- Konstantinos Chalkias (born 1974), Greek footballer
- Konstadinos Gatsioudis (born 1973), Greek athlete
- Konstantinos Gavras (born 1933, known professionally as "Costa-Gavras"), Greek-French filmmaker
- Konstantinos Kanaris (1790–1877), Greek admiral and statesman, former Prime Minister of Greece
- Konstantinos Karamanlis (1907–1998), former Prime Minister and President of Greece
- Konstantinos Kenteris (born 1973), Greek athlete (sprinter) and Olympic gold medalist
- Konstantinos Koukodimos (born 1969), former Greek athlete and politician
- Konstantinos Logothetopoulos (1878–1961), former Prime Minister of Greece
- Kostas Mitroglou (born 1988), Greek footballer
- Konstantinos Mitsotakis (1918–2017), former Prime Minister of Greece
- Konstantinos Paparrigopoulos (1815–1891), Greek historian
- Konstantinos Papathanassiou, German engineer
- Konstantinos Psachos (1869–1949), Greek scholar and musicologist
- Konstantinos Simitis (born 1936), former Prime Minister of Greece
- Konstantinos Stephanopoulos (1926–2016), former President of Greece
- Konstantinos Tsaldaris (1884–1970), Greek politician
- Konstantinos Tsatsos (1899–1987), former President of Greece
- Konstantinos Tsiklitiras (1888–1913), Greek athlete and Olympic gold medalist
- Konstantinos Versis (1901–1941), Greek Army officer
- Konstadinos Zalagitis (born 1980), Greek athlete (triple jump)
- Zara Yaqob (1399–1468), Constantine (Kostentinos or Kwenstantions) I of Ethiopia
- Eskender (1471–1494), Constantine (Kostentinos or Kwenstantions) II of Ethiopia
- Constantinos Constantinos(Constantinou), Cypriot electrician

== See also ==
- Konstantin
- Konstantine
- Constantin
- Constantine (name)
- Costas
