= Costal =

Costal may refer to:

- an adjective related to the rib (Latin: costa) in anatomy
  - Costal cartilage, a type of cartilage forming bars which serve to prolong the ribs forward
  - Costal margin, the medial margin formed by the false ribs
  - Costal surface (disambiguation)
  - Costal groove, a groove between the ridge of the internal surface of the rib
- Costal vein, a type of insect wing segment in the Comstock–Needham system

== See also ==
- Costa (disambiguation)
- Costas (disambiguation)
- Coastal
- Intercostal (disambiguation)
