= Costas =

Kostas or Costas (Greek: Κώστας) is a Greek given name and surname. As a given name, it can be a hypocorism for Konstantinos (Constantine).

== Given name ==
- Kostas Antetokounmpo (born 1997), Greek basketball player
- Costas Azariadis (born 1943), Greek economist
- Kostas Biris (1899–1980), Greek architect
- Costas Georgiou (1951–1976), Greek Cypriot mercenary
- Kostas Lazarides (born 1949), aka Kostas (songwriter), Greek-American country music songwriter
- Costas Mandylor (born 1965), Greek Australian actor
- Kostas Papanikolaou (born 1990), Greek basketball player
- Costas Rigas (born 1944), Greek basketball player
- Costas Simitis (1936–2025), Prime Minister of Greece
- Kostas Hatzichristos (1921–2001), Greek actor
- Kostas Karamanlis (born 1956), former Prime Minister of Greece
- Kostas Koufogiorgos (born 1972), Greek-German cartoonist

== Surname ==
- Bob Costas (born 1952), American sportscaster and talk show host
- John P. Costas (engineer) (1923–2008), American engineer
- John P. Costas (business) (born 1957), American businessman, banker and trader
- Jon Costas (born 1957), American politician
- Ledicia Costas (born 1979), Galician writer
- William P. Costas (1927–2013), American businessman and politician

== See also ==
- Costa (disambiguation)
- Costa's hummingbird
- Costal (disambiguation)
- Kostas (film)
- Kostis (disambiguation)
