= Kostis =

Kostis (Greek: Κωστής) is a hypocorism of the Greek name Konstantinos (Constantine). Notable people with the name include:

== Given name ==
- Kostis Adosidis Pasha (1818–1895), Prince of Samos
- Kostis Chatzidakis (born 1965), Greek politician
- Kostis Gimossoulis (born 1960), Greek poet and novelist
- Costis Gontikas (born 1994), Greek professional basketball player
- Kostis Gontikas (born 1934), Greek politician
- Kostis Palamas (1859–1943), Greek poet
- Kostis Papagiorgis (1947–2014), Greek essayist, columnist, translator of philosophical studies
- Kostis Protopapas, American opera artistic director of Greek origin
- Konstantinos "Kostis" Stephanopoulos (1926–2016), Greek politician, President of Greece from 1995 to 2005

== Surname ==
- Christos Kostis (born 1972), Greek football (soccer) player
- Peter Kostis (born 1946), American golf analyst and instructor
- Tasos Kostis (born 1951), Greek actor

== See also ==
- Costi (disambiguation)
- Kosti (disambiguation)
- Kostas (disambiguation)
