= Tamara Konstantinova =

Soviet aviator (1919–1999)

Tamara Fyodorovna Konstantinova
- Тамара Фёдоровна Константинова
- Born: 7 November 1919; Nigeryovo village, Tver Governorate, Russian SFSR
- Died: 28 July 1999 (aged 79); Voronezh, Russia
- Relatives: Vladimir Konstantinov (brother)
- Military career
- Allegiance: Soviet Union
- Branch: Soviet Air Force
- Service years: 1943–1945
- Rank: Senior Lieutenant
- Units: 566th Assault Aviation Regiment; 999th Assault Aviation Regiment
- Conflicts: World War II
- Awards: Hero of the Soviet Union

Tamara Fyodorovna Konstantinova (Russian: Тамара Фёдоровна Константинова; 7 November 1919 – 28 July 1999) was an Ilyushin Il-2 pilot and deputy squadron commander in the Soviet Air Force during the Second World War. On 29 June 1945, she was awarded the title of the Hero of the Soviet Union. Her brother, Vladimir Konstantinov, was also a Hero of the Soviet Union.

== Civilian life ==
Konstantinova was born on 7 November 1919 to a Russian peasant family in Tver Governorate of the RSFSR, but spent most of her childhood in the city of Kalinin where her family moved to in 1924. Having completed her ninth grade of school in 1936 she wanted to attend a technical school, but she could not afford to do so and had to take up a job as a literacy worker to support her family; her mother was very ill and her father, a World War I veteran, died of alcoholism in 1937. She went on to work as a schoolteacher and secretary, resulting in her being assigned to the village of Skopin in the Ryazan oblast. There she began training at the Skoping aeroclub, where she met Vasily Ivanovich Lazarev, a pilot. The couple married and their daughter Vera was born in 1938. From January 1940 to December 1941, Konstantinova worked as a flight instructor at the Kalinin aeroclub, after which she moved to Baku because her husband was assigned to the Azerbaijan Civil Aviation Management Department at that time. After her husband was seriously injured in a plane crash in September 1942, he was evacuated to the city of Molotov, where Konstantinova was sent to care for him, but he died in February 1943.

== Military career ==
Not long after becoming a widow, she voluntarily joined the military. At first she was assigned to a communications company as a driver, but due to her previous flight experience, she requested a transfer to serve as a pilot, resulting in her reassignment to the 554th Separate Aviation Communications Squadron in August 1943. She remained in that unit until being transferred to the 386th Night Bomber Aviation Regiment in December; there she flew cargo and bombing missions in the Po-2, a slow biplane. Seeking a more adventurous role in the war, she requested to be trained to fly the Il-2; so from May to July 1944, she underwent training in the 15th Separate Training Aviation Regiment of the 13th Air Army before being posted to the 566th Assault Aviation Regiment. She began to tally sorties combat piloting on the Il-2, and was soon promoted to flight commander in September 1944. When she was nominated for the title Hero of the Soviet Union on 15 March 1945 for flying 66 sorties on the Il-2, she had risen to the position of deputy squadron commander in the 999th Assault Aviation Regiment. By the end of the war, she flew 67 missions on the Il-2, contributing to significant destruction of enemy manpower and equipment, having taken out eight anti-aircraft guns, two tanks, five train cars, and various other military targets.

== Postwar ==
Konstantinova remained on active duty in the 999th Assault Aviation Regiment until entering the reserve in September 1945. Having moved to Voronezh in December 1946, she worked as an assistant director of a law school for a year. While still posted to the law school, she began working for the civil air fleet as a pilot in August 1947, but after a crash in poor weather conditions on 20 December 1947 left her with a serious leg injury, she was ruled unable to continue flying in April 1948. Having become a member of the Communist Party in 1949, she worked as a secretary for the commander of the Air Force of the Voronezh Military District from November 1949 to September 1951, then as the executive officer of the air force supply department of the military district until June 1952. From then until 1955, she held several leadership posts at a factory, after which she graduated from the Higher Regional Party School of Voronezh in 1959. Afterwards, she was deputy head of the Voronezh department of social welfare for ten years. She lived out the remainder of her life in Voronezh, where she died on 28 July 1999 at the age of 79 and was buried in the Kominternovskoye cemetery.

== Awards ==
- Hero of the Soviet Union (29 June 1945)
- Order of Lenin (29 June 1945)
- Two Order of the Red Banner (2 November 1944 and 19 March 1945)
- Order of the Patriotic War 1st class (11 March 1985)
- Order of the Red Star (15 July 1944)

== See also ==
- List of female Heroes of the Soviet Union
- Anna Yegorova
- Lidiya Shulaykina
- Mariya Tolstova
- Lyolya Boguzokova
