= Pontin =

Pontin or Pontins may refer to:

== People ==
- Constans Pontin (1819–1852), Swedish author
- Fred Pontin (1906–2000), British businessman
- Jason Pontin (born 1967), British-American journalist
- Keith Pontin (born 1956), Welsh association football player

== Other uses ==
- Pontins, holiday parks operator, founded by Fred Pontin
- International Open Series, also known as Pontins International Open Series
- Les Pontins, a high mountain pass in Switzerland
- Avang, a native boat of the Ivatan people in the Philippines also known as "Pontin"
