= Alković =

Alković is a surname. Notable people with the surname include:

- Kosta Alkovic (1834–1909), Serbian physicist
- Marijan Alković (1879–1953), Croatian prosaist
