= Konstantine =

- Pronunciation: [CON-stan-teen]
- Gender: Male

Origin
- Origin: Latin
- Meaning: "constant, steadfast"

Other names
- Nicknames: Costel, Costin, Kosta, Kostya, Kote
- Derived: Constantinus
- Related names: Constantinus, Constantine, Konstantin, Kostandin

Konstantine is a masculine given name. Notable people with the name include:

- Kote Abkhazi (1867—1923), Georgian prince, major-general, politician and anti-Soviet nationalist
- Konstantine Andronikashvili (1876 – 1937), Georgian politician, member of anti-Soviet resistance
- Konstantine Bagration of Mukhrani (1838–1903), Georgian nobleman and military officer
- Konstantine Bagration of Mukhrani (1889–1915), Georgian prince
- Konstantine Dadeshkeliani (1826–1857), Georgian prince
- Konstantine Gamsakhurdia (1893–1975), Georgian writer
- Konstantine Gamsakhurdia (politician) (born 1961), Georgian politician
- Konstantine Hovhannisyan (1911–1984), Armenian professor, architect and archaeologist
- Konstantine Janashia (born 1990), Georgian strongman
- Konstantine Kupatadze (born 1983), Georgian boxer
- Konstantine Vardzelashvili (born 1972), Georgian lawyer, judge

== See also ==
- Konstantin
- Constantine (name)
- Konstantinos
