= Iris-Tatjana Kolassa =

German psychologist

- Education: University of Konstanz; University of Minnesota; University of Jena
- Scientific career
- Thesis: Cortical correlates of the processing of feared and fear relevant stimuli evidence from event related potential studies comparing phobic and non-phobic subjects (2004)

Iris-Tatjana Kolassa is a German psychologist who is a professor at the University of Ulm. Her research investigates stress, trauma and depression, and how biomolecular processes impact mental disorders. She was awarded an ERC Consolidator Grant and the Science Award of the City of Ulm.

== Early life and education ==
Kolassa studied psychology at the University of Konstanz and the University of Minnesota. She was a doctoral researcher at the University of Jena, where she studied fear in phobic and non-phobic studies. Kolassa returned to the University of Konstanz as a postdoctoral researcher, where she worked in clinic psychology. She was awarded a Heidelberg Academy of Sciences and Zukunftskolleg Junior Fellowship.

== Research and career ==
Kolassa investigates the impact of traumatic stress on the mind, brain and immune system. She has studied "fear networks", a brain pathway where traumatic memories are stored. She was made an Emmy Noether Fellowship in 2008. Her research has shown that people with major depressive disorder have reduced mitochondrial energy production, i.e., it is a cellular-metabolic disorder. Kolassa is interested in whether psychotherapy (including cognitive behavioural therapy) can normalise energy pathways.

== Awards and honours ==
- International Association for Psychological Science Janet Taylor Spence Award
- DeGPT Foerderpreis der Falk-von-Reichenbach-Stiftung Young Investigator Award
- Science Award of the City of Ulm
- ERC Consolidator Grant

== Selected publications ==
- Thomas Straube; Iris-Tatjana Kolassa; Madlen Glauer; Hans-Joachim Mentzel; Wolfgang H R Miltner (1 December 2004). "Effect of task conditions on brain responses to threatening faces in social phobics: an event-related functional magnetic resonance imaging study". Biological Psychiatry. 56 (12): 921–930. doi:10.1016/j.biopsych.2004.09.024. ISSN 0006-3223. PMID 15601601. Wikidata Q50983789.
- Iris-Tatjana Kolassa; Verena Ertl; Cindy Eckart; Stephan Kolassa; Lamaro P. Onyut; Thomas Elbert (2010). "Spontaneous remission from PTSD depends on the number of traumatic event types experienced". Psychological Trauma: Theory, Research, Practice, and Policy. 2 (3): 169–174. doi:10.1037/a0019362. ISSN 1942-9681. Wikidata Q58890812.
- Hannah Gola; Harald Engler; Annette Sommershof; et al. (29 January 2013). "Posttraumatic stress disorder is associated with an enhanced spontaneous production of pro-inflammatory cytokines by peripheral blood mononuclear cells". BMC Psychiatry. 13: 40. doi:10.1186/1471-244x-13-40. ISSN 1471-244X. PMC 3574862. PMID 23360282. Wikidata Q34566800.
