= Konstantinos Psachos =

Greek scholar and musicologist

- Born: May 18, 1869; Mega Revma, Ottoman Empire
- Died: July 9, 1949 (aged 80); Athens, Greece
- Occupations: Scholar and musicologist
- Known for: Invention of Panarmonio

Konstantinos Psachos (Greek: Κωνσταντίνος Ψάχος; May 18, 1869 – July 9, 1949) was a Greek scholar, educator, musician, composer, cantor and musicologist.

== Biography ==
He was born in the village of Mega Revma near Constantinople in 1869. He was the son of Irene-Erifylli and Alexander Psachos, descended from Cephalonia.

A few years later he entered the Central Seminary of Constantinople as a supernumerary. In the Central Seminary, Psachos completed the circular education and was also taught chanting by the responsible teacher and housekeeper of the School, Archimandrite Theodore Matzouranis.

In May 1887, he became a cantor (domestikos) at the Church of the Transfiguration in Galata, serving there until 1891. In 1892, he became archcantor at the Saint Charalampos Greek Hospital of Smyrna. He returned to Constantinople and in 1895 was appointed as archcantor at the Metochion of the Holy Sepulchre, where he was given the opportunity to study many manuscripts in the library of the Metochion.

He also served as teacher of Greek language and religion in various schools, such as the Girls' School at the Metochion, to which he was appointed in 1896. In 1898, he helped establish the "Ecclesiastical Music Association of Constantinople", of which he was special secretary and where he actively served until 1902, when he resigned. He also served as archcantor at the churches of Saint Theodore of Vlanga (1901 to 1903) and Saint Nicholas of Galata (1903 to 1904).

=== Life in Athens ===
In the early 20th century, Theocletus, the Archbishop of Athens, and George Nazos, director of Athens Conservatory, decided to establish a school of Byzantine music and wrote to the Patriarchate of Constantinople, requesting suggestions for the school's first director. Patriarch Anthimus VII responded to their request by suggesting that Konstantinos Psachos was a suitable person for this post. In 1904, by order of the King George I of Greece, a warship sailing to Constantinople took Psachos to Athens, where he arrived in September 1904. On 23 September 1904 the School began its operation.

On 4 September 1905 he married Evanthia Amerikanou from Smyrna. In 1919, he clashed with the Directorate of the Athens Conservatory, and left the school, along with Manolis Kalomiris. In October 1919, he founded the National Conservatory of Music in Athens.

Psachos' first wife died in 1922. He married his second wife, Amalia Armao, in December 1932 at Delphi.

== Musical work ==
Konstantinos Psachos studied the notation of Byzantine and ancient Greek music. He invented a keyboard musical instrument, the Panarmonio of Eva, dedicated to his friend and pupil, Eva Palmer-Sikelianou, in order to perform Byzantine music in a more authentic manner. He wrote music for ancient tragedies and proposed the harmonization of Byzantine music with the use of two or three resonant lines instead of only one.

Psachos wrote Greek music theory. As well as setting sacred chanting to music, he wrote secular music. He set to music the ancient Hymn to Apollo, wrote chorales of ancient tragedies (such as Sophocles' Antigone), composed works for orchestra and choir and published many studies. He also compiled a collection of folk-songs with Byzantine and European musical notation. Particular arrangements include "Axion Esti" in the harmonic mode and the "Apostolic cut" in chromatic fourth mode.

Psachos exposed many of his students to chanters during his career. He taught the Constantinople patriarchal style of chanting, which was unknown compared to Bavarian four-vocal chanting. A large number of his works published in the Athens music magazine "Phorminx". Psachos was the first who published the Divine Liturgy with a resonant line, also publishing a book, "Asian Lyre", currently taught as an instruction book in many Greek conservatories. In this work, he analyzes the maqams, modes and scales of eastern music. The book also contains songs of external rhythmic music, published in the minutes of the former "Ecclesiastical Music Association of Constantinople" and the newspaper "Ecclesiastical Truth" of the Ecumenical Patriarchate.

He signed his texts as K.A. Psachos, or K.A.PS., and often signed under various pseudonyms, including: An Orthodox, Jeremiah from Sion, Remote-friend of Music, Terpandros, Kostaras, Elder amateur, Stranger, Strange, Mathematician, Enslaved redeemed, etc.

=== Major works ===
- Book of the Divine Liturgy (Athens 1905), "Phorminx" magazine, 2nd season, 1st year. It contains the verses used by deacon and priest at the Divine Liturgy.
- "Asian Lyre" (Athens 1908). Contains analysis on maqams of Eastern music.
- "Divine Liturgy", volume I (Athens 1909). It contains the music of the Divine Liturgy with dual resonant line.
- Hymns of the Divine Liturgy (Athens 1912). Contains two complete sets of cherub at the eight modes, Koinonika, Polychronismous and Liturgicals.
- Octoechos system of Byzantine music, ecclesiastical and secular and harmonic resonant (Athens 1941)

== Memorials ==
In 1932, the Education Minister, George Papandreou, appointed him as the music supervisor of churches. Despite the persistent efforts of Manolis Kalomiris, he was not promoted any further than the Secretary I grade, nor elected an Academician.

He died in Athens in 1949.

A street in Nea Smyrni, a southern suburb of Athens, was named in his honor.
