= Vladimir Konstantinov (disambiguation) =

Vladimir Konstantinov is a former professional ice hockey defenceman from Russia.

Vladimir Konstantinov may also refer to

- Vladimir K. Konstantinov, Russian actor who appeared in The New Gulliver
- Vladimir Konstantinov (politician), Crimean politician
- Vladimir Konstantinov (pilot), Soviet bomber and ground attack pilot during World War II
