= Kosta (given name) =

Kosta is a given name and nickname, often a short form of Konstantine or Konstantin. Bearers of the name include:

== Given name ==
- Kosta Abrašević (1879–1898), Serbian poet
- Kosta Aleksić (born 1998), Serbian footballer
- Kosta Bjedov (born 1986), Serbian footballer
- Kosta Čavoški (born 1941), Serbian law professor
- Kosta Dzugaev (born 1956), South Ossetian politician
- Kosta Hristić (1852–1927), Serbian lawyer, diplomat and Minister of Justice
- Kosta Josipović (1887–1919), Serbian Impressionist painter
- Kosta Koça (born 1934), Albanian footballer and coach
- Kosta Miličević (1877–1920), Serbian Impressionist painter
- Kosta Nedeljković (born 2005), Serbian footballer
- Kosta Novaković (1886–1939), Serbian and Yugoslav socialist politician, journalist and professor
- Kosta Papić (born 1960), Serbian football coach
- Kosta Perović (born 1985), Serbian basketball player
- Kosta Petratos (born 1998), Australian soccer player
- Kosta Protić (1831–1892), first Serbian general and a Chief of the Serbian General Staff
- Kosta Runjaić (born 1971), German football manager
- Kosta Apostolov Solev (1908–1943), pen name Kočo Racin, Macedonian author and socialist activist considered a founder of modern Macedonian literature
- Kosta Taušanović (1854–1902), Serbian politician, government minister and banker
- Kosta Tomašević (1923–1976), Serbian footballer
- Kosta Trifković (1843–1875), Serbian playwright
- Kosta Vojinović (1891–1917), Serbian officer, one of the leaders of the Toplica Uprising against Bulgarian occupiers of Serbia
- Kosta Kecmanović (born 2009), Serbian perpetrator of the Belgrade school shooting

== Nickname ==
- Kostantin Kosta Alkovic (1834–1909), Serbian physicist, state advisor and minister of construction
- Konstantinos Kosta Barbarouses (born 1990), New Zealand footballer
- Kostandinos Kosta Grozos (born 2000), Australian soccer player
- Kostadinos Kosta Karageorge (1992–2014), American football player and collegiate wrestler whose suicide raised issues about chronic traumatic encephalopathy in athletes
- Konstantin Kosta Khetagurov (1859–1906), national poet who is generally regarded as the founder of Ossetian literature
- Konstantine Kosta Koufos (born 1989), Greek-American basketball player
- Konstantin Kosta Magazinović (1819–1891), Serbian politician and diplomat
- Kostantin Kosta Milovanović (1847–1905), Serbian general and rifle designer
- Konstantin Kosta Mušicki (1897–1946), Yugoslav brigadier general who commanded the collaborationist Serbian Volunteer Corps during World War II
- Konstantin Kosta Nađ (1911–1986), Yugoslav World War II Partisan Army general
- Konstantin Kosta Pećanac (1879–1944), Serbian and Yugoslav Chetnik commander during the Balkan Wars, World War I and World War II
- Konstantin Kosta Vojnović (1832–1903), Croatian Serb politician, university professor and rector

== See also ==
- Kosta (surname)
