= Costel =

Costel is a Romanian male given name, a diminutive of Constantin (other Romanian diminutives of Constantin are Costin, Costi, Costinel, Costică, Titi). It is also a Spanish given name. Costel may refer to:

- Costel Busuioc
- Costel Câmpeanu
- Costel Danculea
- Costel Grasu
- Costel Mozacu
- Costel Pantilimon
- Costel Rădulescu
