= Konstantinovsky District =

Location of Amur Oblast in Russia

Location of Rostov Oblast in Russia

Konstantinovsky District (Russian: Константи́новский райо́н) is the name of several administrative and municipal districts in Russia:

- Konstantinovsky District, Amur Oblast, an administrative and municipal district of Amur Oblast
- Konstantinovsky District, Rostov Oblast, an administrative and municipal district of Rostov Oblast

== See also ==
- Konstantinovsky (disambiguation)
- Konstantinovskoye Municipal Okrug, a municipal okrug of Krasnoselsky District of Saint Petersburg
