= Vsevolod Konstantinov =

Russian psychologist (born 1975)

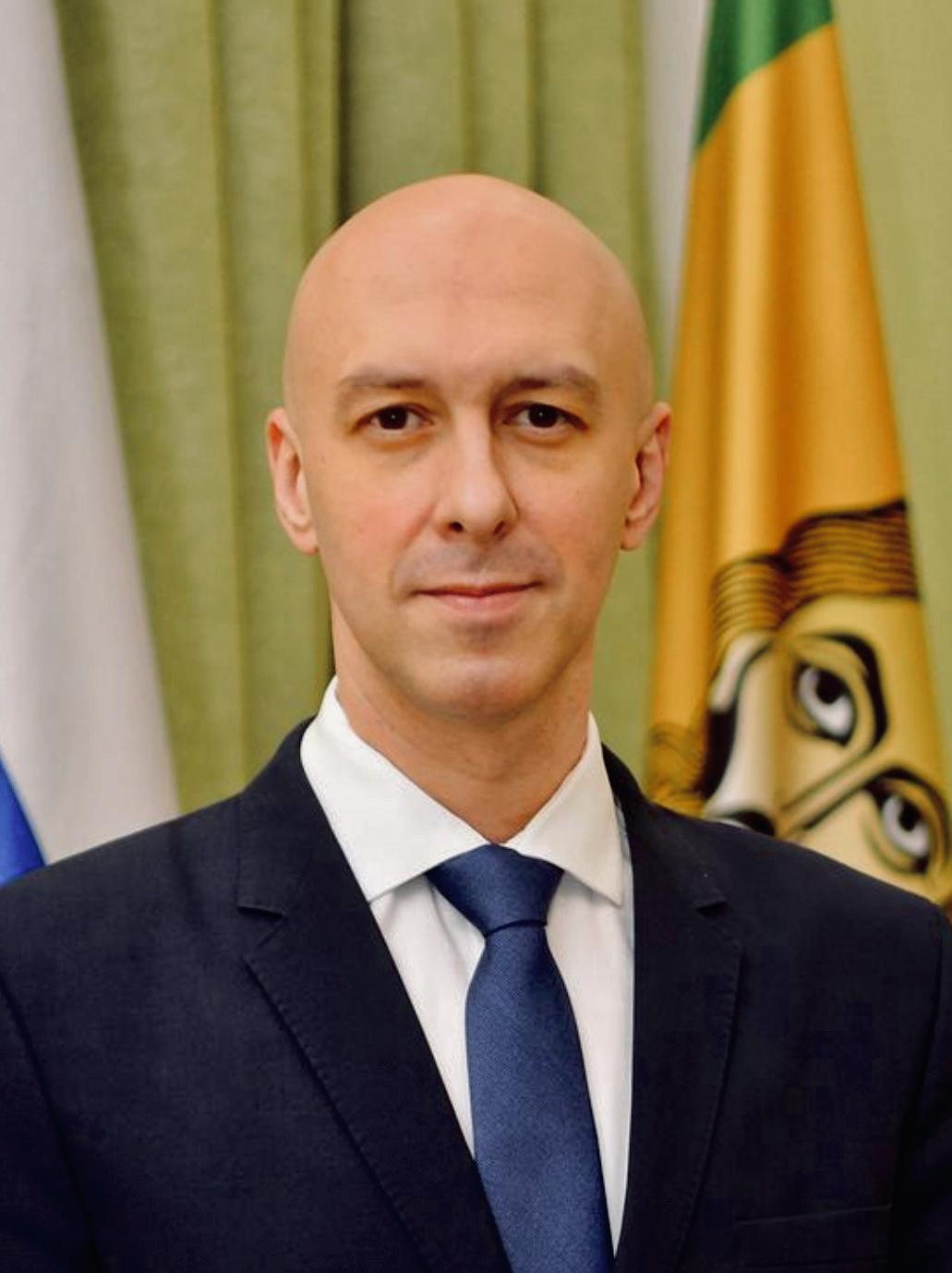
- Vsevolod Konstantinov, 2021
- Born: Vsevolod Valentinovich Konstantinov; August 18, 1975 (age 51); Penza, Russia
- Citizenship: Russian
- Education: Penza State Pedagogical University
- Scientific career
- Fields: psychology
- Workplaces: Penza State University

Vsevolod Konstantinov (Russian: Всеволод Константинов; born August 18, 1975, Penza, USSR) is a Russian psychologist, Doctor of Psychology (2018), Professor at the Russian Academy of Education, and Head of the Department of General Psychology, Penza State University.

== Biography ==
He was born on August 18, 1975, in Penza, in a family of doctors. In 1992, he graduated from Penza Classical Gymnasium No. 1 named after V. G. Belinsky.

In 1999, he graduated from the Faculty of Psychology and Social Work of Penza State Pedagogical University named after V. G. Belinsky.

In 2004, he defended PhD thesis on the following topic: “Dependence of the success of socio-psychological adaptation of forced migrants to new living conditions on the type of residence”.

In 2015, he gave a lecture course on “Migration processes in Russia over the past 30 years” for students and staff of Stockholm University (Sweden).

In 2018, he defended his thesis for the Doctor of Psychology degree on “Socio-psychological adaptation of migrants in the host multicultural society”.

In 2020, he was awarded the academic title of professor in the scientific specialty “Social Psychology”.

== Scientific research activities ==
The scope of his scientific interests includes problems of adaptation of migrants and refugees in new living conditions, psychological aspects of cultural transmission, socio-psychological aspects of personality maladaptation, transformation of migrant identity, ethnicity, methodological problems of ethnopsychology, host population, problems of addictive behavior.

He developed a new scientific concept of socio-psychological adaptation of migrants in a multicultural society, and proposed an original typology of adaptation processes.

He is the chief editor of the “Penza psychological newsletter” electronic scientific journal and a member of the editorial boards of the following journals:

- Frontiers in Psychology /Health Psychology
- Frontiers in Psychiatry / Anxiety and Stress Disorders
- Journal of Loss and Trauma (Taylor & Francis)
- EC Neurology
- Psychological Trauma: Theory, Research, Practice, and Policy (APA)

Heis a member of the review board of the following journals:

- Behavioral Sciences (MDPI)
- European Journal of Investigation in Health Psychology and Education (MDPI)
- OBM Integrative and Complementary Medicine (LIDSEN).

He is a guest editor of special editions of several international scientific publications.

He participates in scientific conferences, congresses, forums, seminars, held in Russia and abroad (USA, England, China, Sweden, Israel, Japan), where he acts as a speaker, member of the organizing committee, program committee.

He publishes his works on current issues in psychology in the mass media.

Konstantinov collaborates with the Regional Alcohol and Drug Abuse Research (RADAR) at Ben Gurion University of the Negev, resulting in a number of studies on the effects of COVID-19 on psycho-emotional well-being, fear, use of psychoactive drugs, eating behavior, and use of coping strategies among the students of “auxiliary” disciplines and university teachers.

He has supervised 14 Candidates of Psychology.

== Scientific works ==
He is the author of more than 200 scientific and methodological works, including 7 monographs, 10 textbooks:

=== Monographs ===
1. Константинов В. В. Социально-психологическая адаптация мигрантов: теория и эмпирические исследования. — Москва : Перо, 2018. — 235 с. ISBN 978-5-00122-557-7

2. Константинов В. В. Психология экстремизма. — Москва : Перо, 2019. (в соавт.) — 253 с. ISBN 978-5-00122-932-2

3. Константинов, В. В. Социально-психологические характеристики адаптации мигрантов в современных условиях : Пензенский гос. пед. ун-т им. В. Г. Белинского. — Пенза : 2007. — 187 с. ISBN 978-5-94321-100-3

4. Миграционные процессы и проблемы адаптации / [А. А. Бучек и др.]; отв. ред. В. В. Константинов. — Пенза : Изд-во ПГПУ им. В. Г. Белинского, 2009. — 183 с. ISBN 978-5-94321-152-2

5. Константинов В. В. Социально-психологическая и социокультурная адаптация соотечественников в России: технологии оптимизации : Пензенский гос. педагогический ун-т им. В. Г. Белинского. — Пенза, 2008. (в соавт.) — 147 с. ISBN 978-5-94321-119-5

6. Константинов В. В. Социально-психологический анализ феномена расставания мигрантов с родиной : Пензенский гос. пед. ун-т им. В. Г. Белинского. — Пенза, 2010. (в соавт.) — 99 с. SBN 978-5-94321-154-6

7. Константинов, В.В. В чужой стране: Социально-психологическая адаптация трудовых мигрантов в России /Монография/ В. В. Константинов, Р. В. Осин, М. В. Бабаева, Е. Б. Бедрина, Е. Б. Кирдяшова, Е. А. Климова. Под научной редакцией В. В. Константинова. Москва: «Перо», 2022. — 185 с.

=== Tutorials ===
1. Константинов В. В. Основы общей психологии: мышление, память, внимание : Учеб.-метод. пособие. — Пенза : Изд-во ПГТУ им. В. Г. Белинского, 2005. — 75 с.; ISBN 5-94321-048-2

2. Константинов В. В. Практикум по психологии личности. — Саратов, Пенза : ПГПУ им. В. Г. Белинского, 2006. — 71 с. ISBN 5-93888-938-3

3. Константинов В. В. История психологии : учебное пособие. Пензенский гос. педагогический ун-т им. В. Г. Белинского. — Пенза : 2007. — 143 с. SBN 978-5-94321-113-3

4. Константинов В. В. История психологии : учебное пособие по специальности «Педагогика и психология» на базе высшего профессионального образования. — Пенза : Изд-во ПГПУ им. В. Г. Белинского, 2011. — 175 с.; 21 см; ISBN 978-5-94321-219-2

5. Психологическая адаптация: опыт исследования и диагностика : учебное пособие / В. В. Константинов, И. А. Красильников. — Пенза : ПГПУ им. В. Г. Белинского, 2008. — 159 с. ISBN 978-5-94321-125-6

6. Константинов В. В. История психологической мысли : учебное пособие. — Пенза : ПГПУ им. В. Г. Белинского, 2009. (в соавт.) — 175 с. ISBN 978-5-94321-130-0

7. Константинов В. В. Психология межличностных отношений : учебно-методическое пособие / Министерство науки и высшего образования Российской Федерации, Федеральное государственное бюджетное образовательное учреждение высшего образования «Пензенский государственный университет». — Пенза : Изд-во ПГУ, 2019. — 68 с. ISBN 978-5-907185-64-7

8. Константинов В. В. Социальная психология : учебное пособие / Министерство науки и высшего образования Российской Федерации, Федеральное государственное бюджетное образовательное учреждение высшего образования «Пензенский государственный университет» (ПГУ). — Пенза : Изд-во ПГУ, 2019. — 174 с. ISBN 978-5-907185-62-3

9. Константинов В. В. Психология межгрупповых отношений : учебно-методическое пособие / Министерство науки и высшего образования Российской Федерации, Федеральное государственное бюджетное образовательное учреждение высшего образования «Пензенский государственный университет» (ПГУ). — Пенза : Изд-во ПГУ, 2019. (в соавт.) — 68 с. ISBN 978-5-907185-63-0

10. Константинов, В. В. Психология экстремизма и терроризма : учебное пособие для вузов / В. В. Константинов, Р. В. Осин. — 2-е изд., перераб. и доп. — Москва : Издательство Юрайт, 2023. — 211 с. — (Высшее образование). — ISBN 978-5-534-17251-5

=== Major scientific articles ===
1. Konstantinov, V. (2017). The Role of the Host Local Population in the Process of Migrants’ Adaptation. Social Sciences, 6 (3), 92. doi:10.3390/socsci6030092

2. Gritsenko, V. V., Khukhlaev, O. E., Zinurova, R. I., Konstantinov, V. V., Kulesh, E. ., Malyshev, I. V., ... Chernaya, A. V. (2021). Intercultural Competence as a Predictor of Adaptation of Foreign Students. Cultural-Historical Psychology, 17(1), 102–112. doi:10.17759/chp.2021170114

3. Khukhlaev O.E., Аlexandrova E.A., Gritstnko V.V., Konstantinov V.V., Kuznetsov I.M., Pavlova O.S., Ryzhova S.V., Shorokhova V.A. Religious Group Identification and Ethno-National Attitudes in Buddhist, Muslim and Orthodox Youth. Kul’turno-istoricheskaya psikhologiya [Cultural-Historical Psychology], 2019. Vol. 15, no. 3, pp. 71–82. doi:10.17759/chp.2019150308

4. Gritsenko, V., Konstantinov, V., Reznik, A., & Isralowitz, R. (2020). Russian Federation medical student knowledge, attitudes and beliefs toward medical cannabis. Complementary Therapies in Medicine, 48, 102274. doi:10.1016/j.ctim.2019.102274

5. Reznik, A., Gritsenko, V., Konstantinov, V. et al. COVID-19 Fear in Eastern Europe: Validation of the Fear of COVID-19 Scale. Int J Ment Health Addiction (2020). https://doi.org/10.1007/s11469-020-00283-3

6. Gritsenko, V., Skugarevsky, O., Konstantinov, V., Khamenka, N., Marinova, T., Reznik, A., & Isralowitz, R. (2020). COVID-19 Fear, Stress, Anxiety, and Substance Use Among Russian and Belarusian University Students. International Journal of Mental Health and Addiction. doi:10.1007/s11469-020-00330-z

7. Isralowitz, R., Khamenka, N., Konstantinov, V., Gritsenko, V., & Reznik, A. (2020). Fear, Depression, Substance Misuse and Related Conditions among Multi-National Medical Students at the Peak of the COVID-19 Epidemic. Journal of Loss and Trauma, 1–4. doi:10.1080/15325024.2020.1799521

8. Suchomlinov, A., Konstantinov, V., & Purlys, P. (2020). Associations between depression, height and body mass index in adolescent and adult population of Penza city and oblast, Russia. Journal of Biosocial Science, 1–5. doi:10.1017/s0021932020000401

9. Reznik, A., Gritsenko, V., Konstantinov, V. et al. First and Second Wave COVID-19 Fear Impact: Israeli and Russian Social Work Student Fear, Mental Health and Substance Use. Int J Ment Health Addiction (2021). https://doi.org/10.1007/s11469-020-00481-z

10. Konstantinov, V., Reznik, A., Zangeneh, M., Gritsenko, V., Khamenka, N., Kalita, V., & Isralowitz, R. (2021). Foreign Medical Students in Eastern Europe: Knowledge, Attitudes and Beliefs about Medical Cannabis for Pain Management. International Journal of Environmental Research and Public Health, 18(4), 2137. doi:10.3390/ijerph18042137

11. Konstantinov, V., Gritsenko, V., Reznik, A., & Isralowitz, R. (2022). The Impact of COVID-19 on Health and Well-Being: Foreign Medical Students in Eastern Europe. Social Sciences, 11(9), 393.

12. Zolotareva, A., Khegay, A., Voevodina, E., Kritsky, I., Ibragimov, R., Nizovskih, N., Konstantinov, V., Malenova, A., Belasheva, I., Khodyreva, N., Preobrazhensky, V., Azanova, K., Sarapultseva, L., Galimova, A., Atamanova, I., Kulik, A., Neyaskina, Y., Lapshin, M., Mamonova, M., ... Osin, E. (2023). Somatic burden in Russia during the COVID-19 pandemic. PLOS ONE, 18(3), e0282345.

13. Bashkin, E. B., Kameneva, G. N., Konstantinov, V., Novikova, I. A., Pilishvili, T. S., Rushina, M. A., & Shlyakhta, D. A. (2025). Time Perspective, Psychological Well-Being and Attitudes to Seeking Mental Health Services in Russian Y and Z Generations. European Journal of Investigation in Health, Psychology and Education, 15(5), 67. doi.org/10.3390/ejihpe15050067
