= Costi =

Costi may refer to:

- a Romanian village, part of Vânători, Galați commune

== People ==
- Cozi Costi, British musician
- Giandomenico Costi (born 1969), Italian football player
- Konstantinos "Costis" Stephanopoulos (1926–2016), president of Greece from 1995 to 2005
- Memnos Costi (born 1976), British television presenter and footballer
- Rochelle Costi (1961–2022), Brazilian photographer
- Costi Ioniță (born 1978), Romanian musician

== See also ==
- Kosti (disambiguation)
