= Athens Conservatoire =

Coordinates: 37°58′24″N 23°44′36″E

- Ωδείον Αθηνών

- Athens, Greece

Information
- Type: Conservatory
- Founded: 1871; 155 years ago
- Campus type: Urban
- Alumni: Gina Bachauer
- Website: www.athensconservatoire.gr

The Athens Conservatoire (Greek: Ωδείον Αθηνών, romanized: Odeíon Athinón) is the oldest educational institution for the performing arts in modern Greece. It was founded in 1871 by the non-profit organization Music and Drama Association.

== History ==
Initially, the musical instruments that were taught there were limited to the violin and the flute, representative of the ancient Greek Apollonian and Dionysian aesthetic principles. Significantly, piano lessons were not included in the program. In 1881 its new German-taught director Georgios Nazos, in a move that was controversial at the time, expanded the conservatoire's program by introducing modern Western European-style instruments and theory material.

Among the musicians who have taught at the Athens Conservatoire are Constantine Psachos, Manolis Kalomiris, Felix Petyrek, Elvira de Hidalgo. Prominent personalities and artists who were taught at Athens Conservatoire include Spyridon Samaras (1875–1882), Maria Callas (1938), Dimitri Mitropoulos (1919), Nikos Skalkottas (graduated 1920), Gina Bachauer (graduated 1929), Mikis Theodorakis, Dimitris Sgouros, Loukas Karytinos and Foivos.

The first Drama School in Greece was also founded in 1871 on the premises, with many prominent theater personalities were included in its teaching staff, such as: Aimilios Veakis, Dimitris Rontiris, Kostas Mousouris, Dimitris Myrat and others.

The institution also runs a Dance School which originated from the establishment of a rhythmic dance school in 1935, which however seized operations a few years after. The school reopened as a fully fledged Dance School in 2011 and in 2018 it gained an official professional accreditation status by the Greek Ministry of Culture.

== Building ==
The Athens Conservatoire is located on Rigillis Street and Vasileos Konstantinou Avenue. The building's facade measures 160 meters the whole building is 13,000 square meters in size. It is an exceptional example of the Bauhaus school and the modern movement in Greece. Designed by the Greek architect Ioannis Despotopoulos (also known as Jan Despo), the only Greek to have studied under Bauhaus school founder Walter Gropius, the Conservatoire is the only completed part of an ambitious large-scale cultural complex commissioned in 1959 by the then government for Athens, for which he earned the top architectural prize of its time. The construction begun in 1969 and stopped in 1976, due to a lack of funding, leaving the building unfinished. In 1980, the Greek state undertook the cost of completing the work in exchange for ownership of the conservatory's old headquarters on Pireos Street.

Despotopoulos' complete proposal for the Athens Cultural Center involved remodeling the space that stretches from Vasilissis Sofias Avenue to Vasileos Konstantinou Avenue, and from Rigillis Street all the way to the National Gallery, spanning an area of nearly 150,000 square meters. According to Despotopoulos' archives on file at the Modern Greek Architecture section of the Benaki Museum, in addition to the Athens Conservatoire, his plan foresaw the construction of an 1,800-seat opera house, a circular theatre stage, an extension to the National Gallery, a new Byzantine Museum, a Byzantine-style church, a hotel, a hall for classical dance performances and the state orchestra, a playhouse for experimental theater, underground garages and more.

A large part of the underground floors of the building was used to host the National Museum of Contemporary Art, Athens (EMST), between September 2008 and May 2015. The venue still hosts important events and cultural exhibitions in Athens.

Since 2013 the Athens Conservatoire entered a new chapter with a series of renovations and the hosting of important cultural events. In 2016, a particular space, located in the first basement area of the building, was fully refurbished and used for the first time since construction, thanks to a generous donation from NEON Organisation, a cultural non-profit institution founded by the art collector and businessman Dimitris Daskalopoulos. The space, since named Polihoros Ω2, is completely transformed into an exhibition space which also contains a small theatre stage and regularly hosts various cultural and artistic events.

Between 8 April and 16 July 2017, the Athens Conservatoire was one of the four main partner venues of the documenta 14 international art exhibition which was, for the first time in its history, hosted in Athens along with its main and original location in Kassel, Germany. For the needs of the exhibition, most open public spaces inside and outside the building were dedicated to the artistic events, needs and exhibits of documenta 14. One of the spaces used for this exhibition is the Amphitheatre, situated underground, which is architecturally inspired by the ancient theatres of Greece. The space hosted a sound installation art project by the Nigerian artist Emeka Ogboh named The Way Earthly Things Are Going and was one of the rare occasions where the space has been open to the public.

In December 2017 the Aris Garoufalis Concert Hall, situated on the upper level of the building, was also completely renovated, architecturally and acoustically, thanks to a donation by the Friends of Aliki Vatikioti for Music and the Arts Foundation. The concert hall now regularly hosts concerts, music competitions, music exams, rehearsals and other cultural events.

Since 2020 a much wider in scope publicly funded construction project for the “Renovation and Modernization of the Building Infrastructure of Athens Conservatoire” is well under way and construction is expected to be completed around springtime 2022.

In its final form, important new facilities will be added to the current building infrastructure, such as an underground Amphitheatre with a 600-seating capacity, a multi-purpose experimental black-box stage of a 200-seating capacity, spaces for conferences, exhibitions and other events, studio suites for sound technology, as well as a public café-restaurant.
