= Eleftherotypia =

Defunct Greek newspaper

- Type: Daily newspaper
- Format: Tabloid
- Editor: Harris Oikonomopoulos (2012–2014); Serafim Fintanidis (1976–2006); Vangelis Panagopoulos
- Founded: 21 July 1975
- Ceased publication: 14 November 2014
- Political alignment: center-left, Pro-Europeanism
- Language: Greek
- Headquarters: Minoos 10–16, 117 43 Neos Kosmos
- City: Athens
- Country: Greece

Eleftherotypia (Greek: Ελευθεροτυπία, lit. 'freedom of the press') was a daily national newspaper published in Athens, Greece.

Published since 21 July 1975, it was the first newspaper to appear after the fall of the Regime of the Colonels, and for most of its period had been one of the two most widely circulated newspapers in the country. Generally taking a center-left, socialist stance, it was respected for its independence and impartiality.

Following the economic downturn in Greece, the newspaper had to file for bankruptcy in 2011. Briefly taken over by a new publisher, lawyer Harris Oikonomopoulos, it was finally shut down in November 2014.

== Profile ==
From the beginning, Eleftherotypia had been an opposition voice against the governments of the conservative Nea Demokratia party. Editors often adopted a social-democratic stance on a number of issues, but more radical viewpoints are also frequently represented in the paper, to a notably greater extent than in centre-left daily To Vima. When in 1981 the socialist PASOK party came into government, it adopted a more pro-government stance but remained critical.

== History ==
=== Foundation ===
Founded as a cooperative owned by its journalists, it was nicknamed "The newspaper with 80 editors-in-chief". It was however soon taken over by the Tegopoulos brothers, and was published by businessman Christos ("Kitsos") Tegopoulos, retaining its traditional socialist domestic and international stance.

In the era of Serafim Fintanidis, who had been editor-in-chief from 1976 until 2006, Eleftherotypia sold up to 160,448 copies and had more than 800 employees.

=== Bankruptcy ===
Amidst the Greek financial crisis, Eleftherotypia was hit hard by dwindling revenues. Because of financial problems, Tegopoulos Publishing was unable to pay its employees from August 2011. A loan settlement with Alpha Bank was reached, causing the staff to be sharply cut and the headquarters to be sold. In October, Alpha Bank however withdrew the settlement, requiring the publisher to file for bankruptcy. The remaining 135 journalists however kept running what remained to be the second-largest newspaper of the country.

=== Relaunch and final closure ===
On 10 January 2013, Eleftherotypia and its internet site Enet were relaunched after new publisher Harris Oikonomopoulos had acquired 67% of Eleftherotypia's shares from the Tegopoulos family. Under the new publisher, the newspaper, however did not recover. For nine months, the editors continued publishing the daily newspaper without being paid any wages. They proposed turning the newspaper back into a cooperative, but Oikonomopoulos turned them down. In November 2014, the newspaper's operations were finally halted and the editors were locked out from the newspaper's website and social media accounts.

BBC News described the closure of Eleftherotypia, which it called "a rare voice of independence and impartiality", as the perhaps most shocking closure of the Greek media landscape.

Former editors and journalists of Eleftherotypia decided to open a new cooperative newspaper under the name Efimerida ton Syntakton.

== Editions ==
=== Weekend editions ===
The newspaper's Sunday edition Kyriakatiki Eleftherotypia (Greek: Κυριακάτικη Ελευθεροτυπία) hosted select articles from Le Monde Diplomatique. Since 2009, it contained The New York Times International Weekly supplement, featuring a selection of articles from The New York Times translated into Greek.

The Saturday and Sunday editions of Eleftherotypia often featured articles by a group of journalists who collectively use the name the "Ios" (Greek "Ιος" meaning "virus"). The Ios were known for targeting and heavily criticizing the Greek far right, the church, the army, the police and United States foreign policy.

=== The "9" comics magazine ===
Every Wednesday, the newspaper features the "9" ("ennea") comics magazine, named after the classification of comics as the "ninth art". 9 enjoys high readership of approximately 200,000 readers weekly. The magazine regularly organizes comics exhibitions and every year holds a competition for new talents and new creators, through which many young Greek comic artists have emerged, such as Helias Kyriazes, Tasos Papaioannou, Argyris Mavreas, Katerina Vamvasaki and Vasilis Lolos.

Each issue usually features an ongoing "central story" which usually takes up four or five consecutive issues, a science-fiction short story and various comics, strips and caricatures. Since the beginning of the magazine's publication in June 2000, no issue has been published without a woman on its front page.

Daily political cartoons were provided by Kostas Koufogiorgos and Vaggeli Papavasiliou.

== Controversy ==
In April 1977, Revolutionary Organization 17 November (17N) sent a manifesto to Eleftherotypia, titled "Reply to the parties and groups" ("Απάντηση στα κόμματα και τις οργανώσεις"). The preface of the manifesto stated that Eleftherotypia was chosen because "a) it reported with respect to the facts of the attacks and b) gave voice to the full spectrum of the Left, even when not accepting its causes". This was the beginning of a trend that continued for almost every such action 17 November undertook, up until the organization's capture in 2002. Other Greek left-wing radical and terrorist organizations, such as ELA as well as small militant anarchist groups, also send their communiques exclusively to Eleftherotypia, under the assumption that the newspaper, while unlikely to be directly supportive, would be more likely to publicise their views.

The newspaper became known for its policy of publishing the proclamations of such groups without criticism. Until 2002 it abstained from condemning terrorist attacks, including assassinations. In the past, some Eleftherotypia editors have also criticised counter terrorism laws, with some perceiving this as evidence that the publication was supportive of terrorism.

In November 2005, the Court of Appeals in Athens found the publisher Tegopoulos Publishing, as well as editor-in-chief Serafim Fintanidis and another 2 persons, guilty of slandering the Public Prosecutor of the trial of the 17N terrorist group, District Attorney Christos Lambrou. They were fined Euro 60,000 each, to be paid to Mr. Lambrou.

== See also ==
- Politics of Greece
- List of newspapers in Greece
- Efimerida ton Syntakton
