= Konstantinovka =

Konstantinovka may refer to:

- İsmətli or Konstantinovka, a place in Azerbaijan
- Konstantinovka, Russia, a list of rural localities in Russia
