= Kosti =

Kosti may refer to:

== Places ==
- Kosti, Sudan, a major city in Sudan
- Kosti, Burgas Province, a village in Bulgaria

== People ==
=== Given name ===
- Kosti Katajamäki (born 1977), Finnish rally driver
- Kosti Manibe Ngai, South Sudanese politician
- Kosti Vehanen (1887–1957), Finnish pianist and composer

=== Family name ===
- Eleni Kosti (born 1985), Greek swimmer
- María Kosti (born 1951), Spanish actress
- Melpo Kosti, Greek television and soap opera actress

== Others ==
- Kushti (or Kusti), a string-like garment which pairs with the Sudreh in Zoroastrianism

== See also ==
- Costi (disambiguation)
- Kostis (disambiguation)
