= Constans (disambiguation) =

Constans (c. 320–350) was a Roman Emperor.

Constans may refer also to:

== People ==
- Constans II (630–668), Emperor of the Byzantine Empire
- Constans II (son of Constantine III) (died 411), co-emperor of the Western Roman Empire
- Constans (consul 414), Magister militum per Thracias and consul in 414
- Constans Lundquist (1891–1950), Swedish diplomat
- Constans Pontin (1819–1852), Swedish journalist and author
- Jean Antoine Ernest Constans (1833–1913), French politician and colonial administrator

== Other uses ==
- The Constant Factor, aka Constans, a 1980 Polish film
- Constans Theatre, located at the University of Florida in Gainesville, Florida
- The CONSTANS transcription factor, part of a florigen-producing pathway in flowering plants
- Dysschema constans, species of moth
- Auximobasis constans, species of moth
- Semioptila constans, species of moth
- Hoplitimyia constans, species of soldier fly
- Trupanea constans, species of fruit fly
- Eucommia constans, extinct species of flowering plant
