= Kostandin =

- Gender: Male

Origin
- Origin: Derived from the Latin name Constantinus
- Region of origin: Albania

Other names
- Related names: Kostë (diminutive form), Koço (diminutive form) Constantinus, Constantine, Konstantin, Konstantine, Konstantinos

Kostandin is an Albanian masculine given name. It is also an Armenian masculine given name (Armenian: Կոստանդին), pronounced Kostandin in Eastern Armenian and Gosdantin in Western Armenian. Both are equivalent to the English name Constantine. Albanians bearing the name Kostandin include:

- Kostandin of Berta (fl. 18th century), writer and translator
- Kostandin Boshnjaku (1888–1953), banker, politician
- Kostandin Çekrezi (1892–1959), patriot, historian, and publicist
- Kostandin Kariqi (born 1996), footballer
- Kostandin Kristoforidhi (1826–1895), translator and scholar
- Kostandin Ndoni (born 1989), footballer
- Kostandin Shpataraku (1736–1767), painter
- Kostandin Zografi (fl. 18th century), painter
