= Ioannis Despotopoulos =

Greek architect

Ioannis Despotopoulos (Greek: Ιωάννης Δεσποτόπουλος; 7 January 1903 – 1 October 1992), also known as Jan Despo, was a Greek architect.

== Biography ==
Despotopoulos was born in Smyrna, Ottoman Empire (modern İzmir, Turkey) in 1903. Soon after he was born, his family moved to the island of Chios where he grew up. He moved to Athens to study architecture. He was enrolled student at the National Technical University of Athens (NTUA) until he quit and left to study at the Bauhaus in Weimar. He then moved to Leibniz University Hannover, graduating from there in 1927.

In 1930, he returned to Greece. By 1943 (during the occupation of Greece by Nazi Germany), Ioannis Despotopoulos became professor at the School of Architecture at the NTUA In 1946, he was discharged from his position at the university, and he moved to Sweden for a period between the years 1947 and 1961. During his stay in Sweden, he worked as an architect and also taught at the Polytechnic Institutes of Stockholm and Gothenburg. He returned to Greece in 1961 and was appointed immediately as a professor at the NTUA until 1968 when he retired. He died in 1992.

== Major works ==
- Church of the Magaziotissa on Chios
- Municipal baths of Chios
- Sotiria Sanatorium, Athens
- Tripoli Sanatorium
- Asvestohori Hospital
- Chios Movie Theatre
- Akadimia Platonos School Complex
- Athens Conservatoire
