= Konstantinovka, Karmaskalinsky District, Republic of Bashkortostan =

Konstantinovka Константиновка
- Village
- Location within Bashkortostan Location within Russia
- Coordinates: 54°24′N 56°09′E
- Country: Russia
- Region: Bashkortostan
- District: Karmaskalinsky District
- Time zone: UTC+5:00

Konstantinovka (Russian: Константиновка) is a rural locality (a village) in Nikolayevsky Selsoviet, Karmaskalinsky District, Bashkortostan, Russia. The population was 1,691 as of 2010. There are 21 streets.

== Geography ==
Konstantinovka is located 7 km north of Karmaskaly (the district's administrative centre) by road. Ulyanovka is the nearest rural locality.
