= Konstantin Romanov =

Konstantin Romanov may refer to:

- Grand Duke Constantine Pavlovich of Russia (1779–1831), second son of the Russian Emperor Paul I
- Grand Duke Konstantin Nikolayevich of Russia (1827–1892), second son of the Russian Emperor Nicholas I
- Grand Duke Konstantin Konstantinovich of Russia (1858–1915), second son of the above Grand Duke Constantine Nicolaievich
- Prince Constantine Constantinovich of Russia (1891–1918), son of the above Grand Duke Constantine Constantinovich
- Konstantin Romanov (ice hockey) (born 1985), Kazakh professional ice hockey player
