= Konstantinos Papathanassiou =

German engineer

Konstantinos Papathanassiou from the German Aerospace Center (DLR) in Wessling, Germany was named Fellow of the Institute of Electrical and Electronics Engineers (IEEE) in 2014 for contributions to polarimetric interferometry for synthetic aperture radar.
