= Konstantinovsky (inhabited locality) =

Konstantinovsky (Russian: Константиновский; masculine), Konstantinovskaya (Константиновская; feminine), or Konstantinovskoye (Константиновское; neuter) is the name of several urban and rural inhabited localities (work settlements, settlements, villages, selos, and stanitsas) in Russia.

Urban localities

- Konstantinovsky, Yaroslavl Oblast, a work settlement in Tutayevsky District of Yaroslavl Oblast

Rural localities

- Konstantinovsky, Saratov Oblast, a settlement in Romanovsky District of Saratov Oblast
- Konstantinovskoye, Kostroma Oblast, a village in Sumarokovskoye Settlement of Susaninsky District of Kostroma Oblast
- Konstantinovskoye, Moscow Oblast, a selo under the administrative jurisdiction of the work settlement of Mikhnevo in Stupinsky District of Moscow Oblast
- Konstantinovskoye, Stavropol Krai, a selo in Konstantinovsky Selsoviet of Petrovsky District of Stavropol Krai
- Konstantinovskaya, Kotlassky District, Arkhangelsk Oblast, a village in Kharitonovsky Selsoviet of Kotlassky District of Arkhangelsk Oblast
- Konstantinovskaya, Shenkursky District, Arkhangelsk Oblast, a village in Rovdinsky Selsoviet of Shenkursky District of Arkhangelsk Oblast
- Konstantinovskaya, Kirov Oblast, a village in Ichetovkinsky Rural Okrug of Afanasyevsky District of Kirov Oblast
- Konstantinovskaya, Krasnodar Krai, a stanitsa in Konstantinovsky Rural Okrug of Kurganinsky District of Krasnodar Krai
- Konstantinovskaya, Stavropol Krai, a stanitsa under the administrative jurisdiction of the city of krai significance of Pyatigorsk, Stavropol Krai
