= Costa =

Costa may refer to:

== Biology ==
- Rib (Latin: costa), in vertebrate anatomy
- Costa (botany), the central strand of a plant leaf or thallus
- Costa (coral), a stony rib, part of the skeleton of a coral
- Costa (entomology), the leading edge of the forewing of winged insects, as well as a part of the male clasper

== Arts and entertainment ==
- Costa!, a 2001 Dutch film
- Costa!!, a 2022 Dutch film
- Costa Book Awards, formerly the Whitbread Book Award, a literary award in the UK

== Organisations ==
- Costa Caribe, a Nicaraguan basketball team
- Costa Coffee, a British coffee shop chain, sponsor of the book award
- Costa Cruises, a leading cruise company in Europe
- Costa Del Mar, an American manufacturer of polarized sunglasses
- Costa Group, Australian food supplier

== Places ==
- Costa, Haute-Corse, France, a commune on the island of Corsica
- Costa, Lajas, Puerto Rico, a barrio
- Costa, West Virginia, US, or Brushton, a community
- Costa Head, a headland on the Orkney Islands
- Departamento de la Costa, a former subdivision of Peru

== People ==
- Costa (surname), including origin of the name and people sharing the surname
- Costa (footballer) (born 1973), Portuguese football manager and former player
- Costa-Gavras (born 1933), Greek-French filmmaker
- Costa Nhamoinesu (born 1986), Zimbabwean former professional footballer

== See also ==
- Costal (disambiguation)
- Costas, a name of Greek origin
