= Rochelle Costi =

Brazilian photographer (1961–2022)

- Born: 1961; Caxias do Sul, Rio Grande do Sul, Brazil
- Died: 26 November 2022; São Paulo, Brazil
- Education: Pontifical Catholic University of Rio Grande do Sul
- Occupation(s): Photographer, photojournalist, painter, installation art, visual artist

Rochelle Costi (1961–2022) was a Brazilian photographer, painter, and installation artist. She was a prominent name in contemporary art in Brazil, and exhibited her work internationally. She photo-documented life in São Paulo in a systematic approach similar to an ethnographical study.

== Early life and education ==
Rochelle Costi was born on 1961 in Caxias do Sul, Brazil. She graduated in 1981 with a degree in social communication from the Pontifical Catholic University of Rio Grande do Sul (PUCRS).

== Career ==
Costi moved to São Paulo in 1988; and between 1991 and 1992, she lived in London, where she studied at the Saint Martin's School of Art and worked at Camera Work (a gallery). She gained prominence for her artwork in the 1990s.

As a photographer, Costi worked in different newspapers and magazines. She participated in the "Quadrennial of Photography" at the São Paulo Museum of Modern Art (1985); "A Paixão do Olhar", at the Museum of Modern Art, Rio de Janeiro (1993); "Contaminated Photography", at Centro Cultural Sao Paulo (1994); "Novas Travessias: New Directions In Brazilian Photography", at The Photographers' Gallery, London (1995); "Sampa", at the Stedelijk Museum Amsterdam (1996); VI Bienal de La Habana (Cuba, 1997); X Biennial of Cuenca, Ecuador (2009); 29th São Paulo Art Biennial (2010); 20th Bienal de Arte Paiz, Guatemala (2016).

Her work is in museum and public collections, such as Caixa Geral de Depósitos, Lisbon; Centro Gallego de Arte Contemporáneo, Santiago de Compostela, Spain; Fonds National d'Art Contemporain, Marseille, France; Fundación Arco, Madrid; Museum Moderner Kunst Stiftung Ludwig, Vienna; Museum of Latin American Art, Long Beach, USA; Museum of Contemporary Art San Diego, La Jolla, USA; Pinacoteca do Estado de São Paulo, São Paulo; São Paulo Museum of Modern Art; and Museum of Modern Art, Rio de Janeiro.

She died on 26 November 2022 at the age of 61 in São Paulo, after being run over by a motorcycle.

== Awards ==
- 1997, Marc Ferrez Award (Brazilian Portuguese: Marc Ferrez da Funarte) from the National Arts Foundation of Brazil
- 1999, National Photography Award of the National Arts Foundation of Brazil
- 2017, Marcantônio Vilaça award
