= Konstantinovka, Medvensky District, Kursk Oblast =

Rural locality in Kursk Oblast, Russia

Konstantinovka Константиновка
- Village
- Interactive map of Konstantinovka
- Location of Konstantinovka Konstantinovka (Kursk Oblast)
- Coordinates: 51°26′50″N 35°57′04″E
- Country: Russia
- Federal subject: Kursk Oblast
- Administrative district: Medvensky District
- SelsovietSelsoviet: Vysoksky

Population (2010 Census)
  - Total: 78
  - Estimate (2010): 78 (0%)

Municipal status
  - Municipal district: Medvensky Municipal District
  - Rural settlement: Vysoksky Selsoviet Rural Settlement
- Time zone: UTC+3 (MSK)
- Postal code: 307040
- Dialing code: +7 47146
- OKTMO ID: 38624408126
- Website: visoksk.rkursk.ru

Konstantinovka (Russian: Константиновка) is a rural locality (Russian: деревня, lit. 'village') in Vysoksky Selsoviet Rural Settlement, Medvensky District, Kursk Oblast, Russia. Population: 78 (2010 census); 89 (2002 census);

== Geography ==
The village is located on the Reut River (a left tributary of the Seym), 58 km (36 mi) from the Russia–Ukraine border, 33 km (21 mi) south-west of Kursk, 10 km (6.2 mi) north-west of the district center – the urban-type settlement Medvenka, 3 km (1.9 mi) from the selsoviet center – Vysokoye.

Climate

Konstantinovka has a warm-summer humid continental climate (Dfb in the Köppen climate classification).

== Transport ==
Konstantinovka is located 9 km (5.6 mi) from the federal route M-2 Crimea Highway (a part of the European route E105), on the road of intermunicipal significance 38H-587 (Spasskoye – Konstantinovka), 22.5 km (14.0 mi) from the nearest railway station Dyakonovo (railway line Lgov I — Kursk).

The rural locality is situated 41 km (25 mi) from Kursk Vostochny Airport, 98 km (61 mi) from Belgorod International Airport and 230 km (140 mi) from Voronezh Peter the Great Airport.
