= Constantin Cantacuzino =

Constantin Cantacuzino may refer to:

- Constantin Cantacuzino (stolnic) (1639–1716), Wallachian stolnic, historian and diplomat
- Constantin Cantacuzino (died 1877), Wallachian kaymakam in 1848
- Constantin Cantacuzino (aviator) (1905–1958), Romanian World War II flying ace

== See also ==
- Cantacuzino family
