= Konstantinovka, Dobryanka, Perm Krai =

Konstantinovka Константиновка
- Village
- Location within Perm Krai Location within Russia
- Coordinates: 58°19′N 56°25′E
- Country: Russia
- Region: Perm Krai
- District: Dobryansky District
- Time zone: UTC+5:00

Konstantinovka (Russian: Константиновка) is a rural locality (a village) in Dobryansky District, Perm Krai, Russia. The population was 9 as of 2010.
