= İsmətli =

Ismetli
- Municipality
- Location within Azerbaijan
- Coordinates: 39°31′41″N 48°32′02″E
- Country: Azerbaijan
- Rayon: Bilasuvar

Population
  - Total: 3,622
- Time zone: UTC+4 (AZT)
  - Summer (DST): UTC+5 (AZT)

Ismetli (known as Konstantinovka until 1992) is a village and municipality in the Bilasuvar Rayon of Azerbaijan. It has a population of 3,622.
