= Intercostal =

Intercostal may refer to:

- Intercostal, between the ribs of an animal
  - Intercostal muscles
  - Supreme intercostal vein
  - Intercostal arteries
  - Intercostal space
