= Kote =

Kote may refer to:

== Arts and entertainment ==
- Kote (film), a 2011 Indian Kannada-language film
- a title character in the 1919 Georgian comic opera Keto and Kote and the 1949 film adaptation of the same title
- KOTE, a country music radio station in Eureka, Kansas, United States
- Kindred of the East (KotE), a tabletop role-playing game book and game line released in 1998

== People ==
- Konstantine Kote Abkhazi (1867—1923), Georgian prince, major-general, politician and anti-Soviet nationalist
- Konstantine Gabashvili (born 1948), Georgian politician and diplomat, Minister of Education (1992—1993), Mayor of Tbilisi (1993)
- Konstantine Kote Kubaneishvili, 20th-21st century Georgian poet
- Constantine Kote Makharadze (1926–2002), Soviet and Georgian actor and sports commentator
- Konstantine Kote Marjanishvili (1872–1933), Georgian theater director
- Kote Tsintsadze (1887–1930), Georgian Bolshevik politician
- Kote Tugushi (born 1983), Georgian basketball coach and former player
- Kristi Kote (born 1998), Albanian footballer
- Nagaraj Kote (born 1965), Indian actor in the Kannada film industry
- Zakalia Koté, Burkinabé politician and Minister of Justice from 2007 to 2011

== Places ==
- Kotë, a village and a former municipality in Albania
- Kote, Karnataka, a village in India

== Other uses ==
- Köte, a charcoal burner's hut in Germany's Harz Mountains
- Kote, a gauntlet (glove) in Japanese armour
