= Costal surface =

Costal surface (referring to the side near the ribs) may refer to:

- Costal surface of lung
- Costal surface of scapula
