= Kostas Koufogiorgos =

Konstantinos "Kostas" Koufogiorgos (born 14 February 1972 in Arta, Greece) is a Greek-German political cartoonist and painter.

== Biography ==
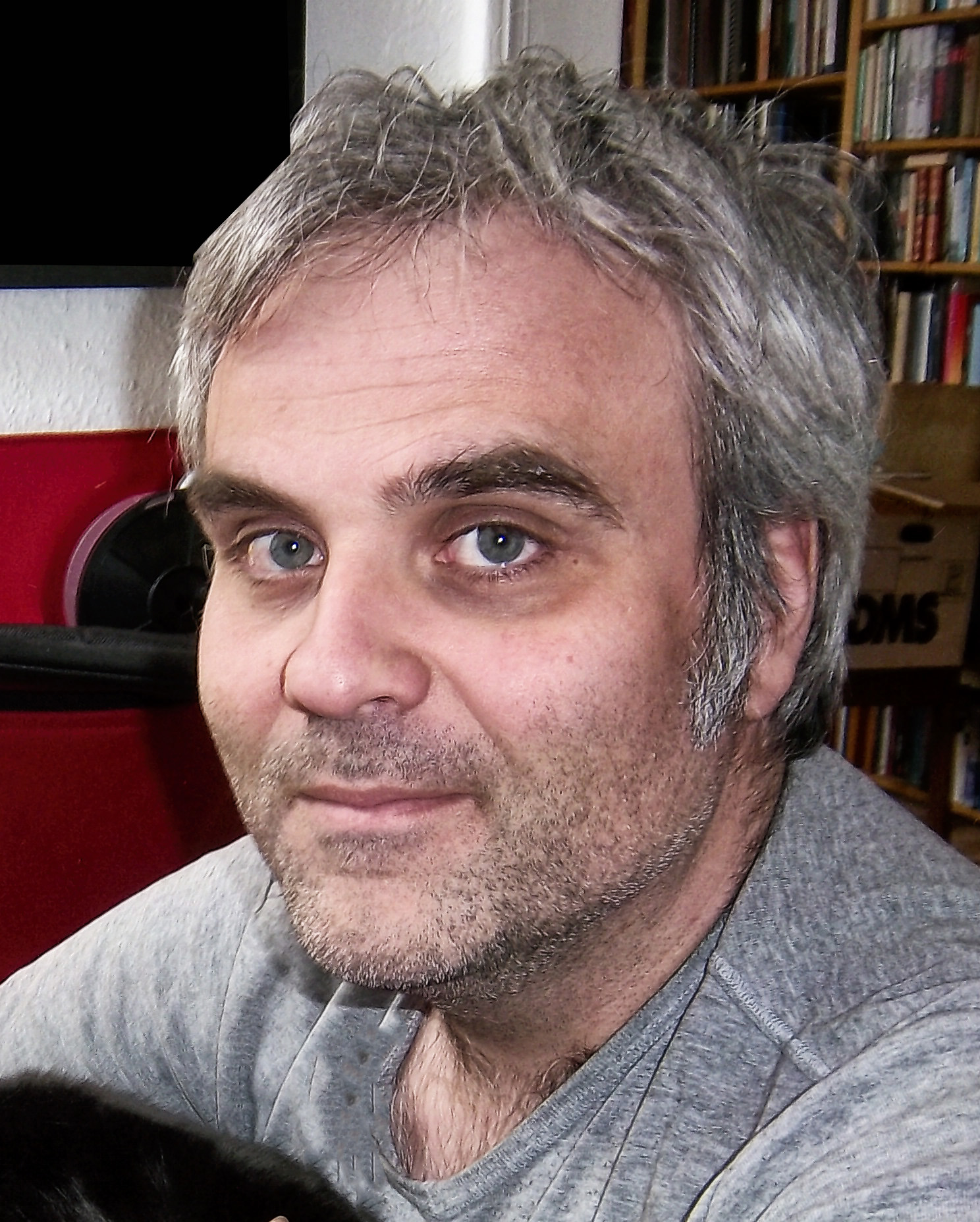

While working as a cartoonist for several newspapers and magazines; Koufogiorgos began studying economics at the University of Athens in 1990. His first work of art was published in 1989 in the political magazine ODIGITIS. Kostas Koufogiorgos has worked for numerous political and business papers, as well as for more than 20 magazines in Greece. Until 2014 he worked for the Greek Newspaper Eleftherotypia. In 2008, he started to work for German media.

Today he is publishing his work in German daily newspapers, e.g. Handelsblatt, "Stuttgarter Zeitung,Magdeburger Volksstimme, Weser Kurier, Fuldaer Zeitung, Neue Osnabrücker Zeitung, Ruhrnachrichten, Freie Presse, Tageblatt (Luxemburg), as well as for online-platforms, e.g. web.de, gmx.de, MSN and magazines.

Kostas Koufogiorgos lives in Stuttgart-Bad Cannstatt.

== Books ==
- Frau Schächtele will oben bleiben. Children's book in cooperation with mit Monika Spang, Silberburg Verlag, Tübingen and Lahr/Schwarzwald 2011, ISBN 978-3-8425-1128-6
- Minima Politika. Political Cartoons with lyrics by Wolfgang Bittner. Horlemann Verlag, Unkel (Germany) 2008, ISBN 978-3-89502-271-5
- Pano Kato. Elefsis, Tripolis (Greece) 2004, ISBN 960-87755-4-X
- ΜΕΡΕΣ ΚΡΙΣHΣ. Cartoons by Kostas Koufogiorgos and Vaggelis Papavasiliou published in Eleftherotypia 2013. Athens 2014
- S 21 Karikaturen Cartoons about the railway project Stuttgart 21. Stuttgart 2016
- 2017 in bunten Bildern Cartoons of the Year 2017. Stuttgart 2017, ISBN 978-3-00-058384-1 More Information koufogiorgos.de

== Exhibitions ==
=== Cartoons ===
- Group Exhibition, Bamberg (Germany), 2006-2010: "For heaven's sake: church in the caricature"
- Exhibition/Lecture, Stuttgart (Germany): "Minima Politika"; Political lyrics and caricatures. In cooperation with Wolfgang Bittner
- Group Exhibition, Berlin (Germany): January 22, 2009 - November 13, 2009: "Rückblende" – Political Caricatures of the year 2008
- Group Exhibition, Berlin (Germany): January 28, 2010 - November 12, 2010: "Rückblende" – Political Caricatures of the year 2009
- Group Exhibition, Berlin (Germany): January 21, 2011 - October 21, 2011: "Rückblende" – Political Caricatures of the year 2010
- Group Exhibition, Berlin (Germany): January 27, 2012 - October 26, 2012: "Rückblende" – Political Caricatures of the year 2011
- Group Exhibition, Stuttgart u. a.: 31 March 2012 - 15 May 2012: "Mit spitzer Feder" - German Award for political cartoons
- Group Exhibition, Berlin (Germany): January 30, 2014 - November 14, 2014: "Rückblende" – Political Caricatures of the year 2013
- Group Exhibition, Potsdam: Karikaturenausstellung der Gemeinsamen Landesplanung Berlin-Brandenburg und Cartoonlobby e. V. "Grenzfälle-Nachbarn wie Du und ich" July 3, 2014 - September 12, 2014
- Group Exhibition, Luckau: "Lob des Kapitalismus...ein Versuch in Bildern". Cartoon Museum Brandenburg August 2, 2014 - October 26, 2014
- Group Exhibition, Berlin (Germany): January 28, 2015 - November 22, 2015: "Rückblende" – Political Caricatures of the year 2014
- Group Exhibition, Berlin (Germany): January 27, 2016 - November 4, 2016: "Rückblende" – Political Caricatures of the year 2015
- Group Exhibition, Celle u. a.: April 11, 2016 (ongoing): "Oh, eine Dummel!"-Rechtsextremismus und Menschenfeindlichkeit in Karikatur und Satire
- Group Exhibition, Berlin (Germany): January 24, 2017 - November 3, 2017: "Rückblende" – Political Caricatures of the year 2016
- Exhibition, Sachsenheim: "Skizzophrenien" Cartoons by Kostas Koufogiorgos. Exhibition Museum of the City of Sachsenheim, June 17 - October 21, 2018.
- Exhibition, Bad Cannstatt: "KarikaturM" Karikaturenausstellung auf dem Cannstatter Stadtkirchenturm 20 July 2019 in Rahmen des Cannstatter Kulturmenues
- Group Exhibition, Berlin (Germany): January 28, 2020 – November 22, 2020: "Rückblende" – Political Caricatures of the year 2019
- Group Exhibition, Berlin (Germany): January 25, 2020 – November 26, 2020: "Rückblende" – Political Caricatures of the year 2020

=== Paintings ===
- Exhibition, Korntal (Germany): May 25, 2007 - August 27, 2007: "Kostas Koufogiorgos-Paintings"
- Group Exhibition, Athens (Greece): February 18, 2009 - March 20, 2009: "The cartoonists are painting"

== Awards ==
- 2012: Mit spitzer Feder" - German Award for political cartoons
- 2016: Mit spitzer Feder" - German Award for political cartoons "Mit spitzer Feder 2015"
- 2016: 3rd Place International Day of Freedom of Press Contest 2016
- 2020: 3rd Place "Rückblende 2019": Der deutsche Preis für die politische Fotografie und Karikatur
- 2022: 2nd Place "Rückblende 2021": Der deutsche Preis für die politische Fotografie und Karikatur
