= Konstantin Pott =

German politician (born 1997)

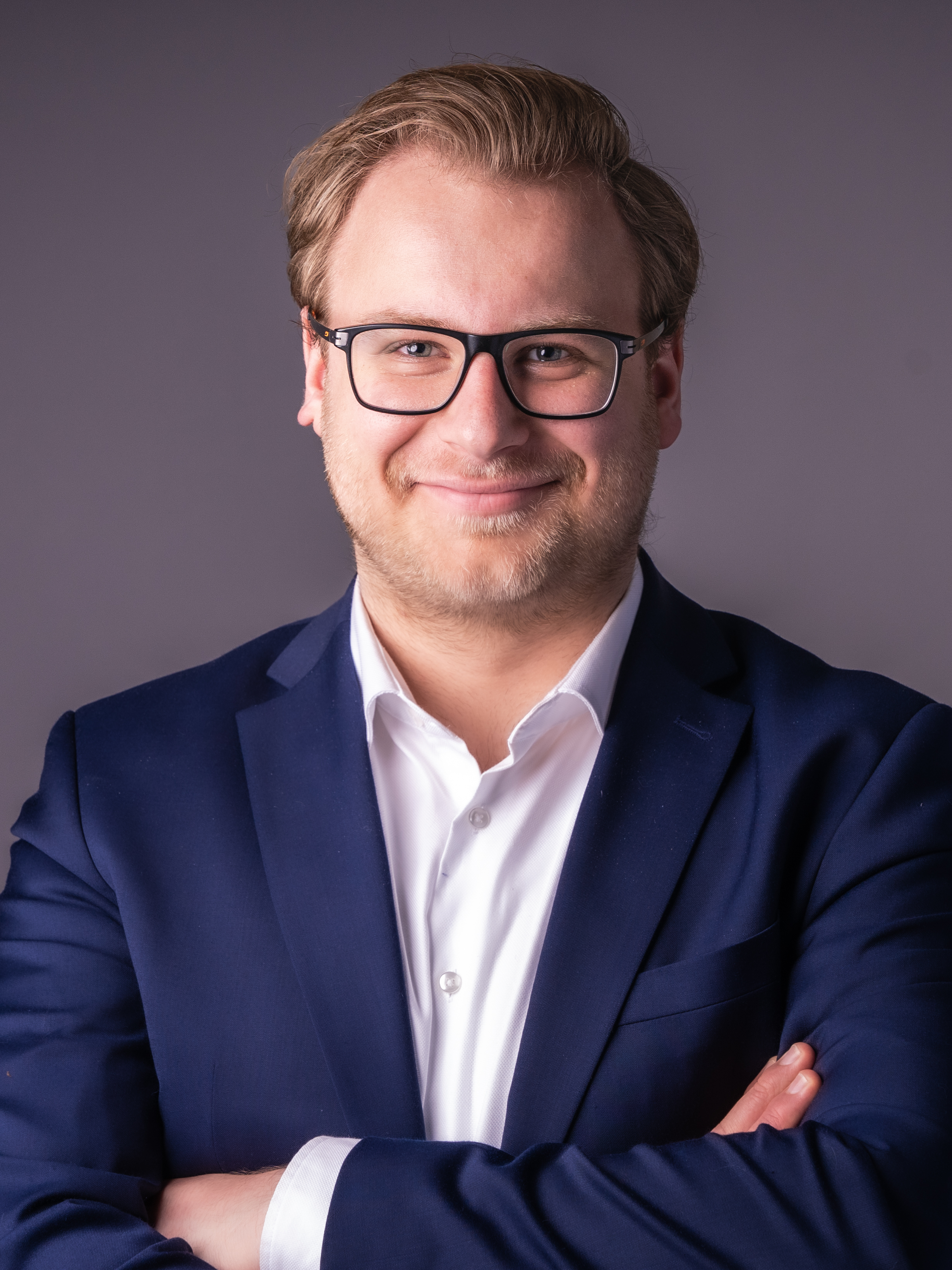
- Pott in 2022

Member of the Landtag of Saxony-Anhalt
- Incumbent
- Assumed office 6 June 2021

Personal details
- Born: 20 August 1997 (age 28)
- Party: Free Democratic Party (since 2017)

Konstantin Pott (born 20 August 1997) is a German politician serving as a member of the Landtag of Saxony-Anhalt since 2021. From 2021 to 2025, he served as chairman of the Young Liberals in Saxony-Anhalt.
