= Knyaz Konstantin =

Knyaz Konstantin may refer to one of the following:

- Knyaz Konstantin of Murom (? - 1129), the son of knyaz Sviatoslav II of Kiev.
- Knyaz Konstantin of Russia (Konstantin Vsevolodovich) (1186–1218), the son of knyaz Vsevolod the Big Nest.
- Knyaz Konstantin Ivanovich Ostrozhskiy, also known as Konstanty Ostrogski, (1463–1533) who was a Hetman of Lithuania.
- Knyaz Konstantin Konstantinovich Ostrozhskiy (? - 1608), the son of the above Knyaz Konstantin Ivanovich Ostrozhskiy.
