= Konstantin Ramul =

Estonian psychologist

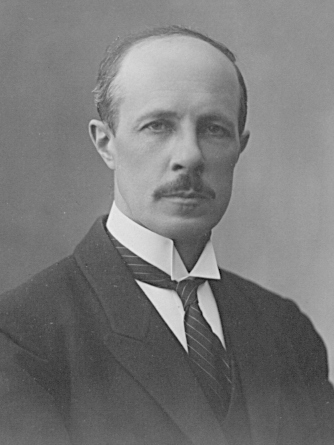
- Ramul, c. 1910s-1920s
- Born: 30 May 1879; Kuressaare, Estonia
- Died: 11 February 1975 (aged 94); Tartu, then part of Estonian SSR, Soviet Union

Konstantin Ramul (30 May 1879 – 11 February 1975) was an Estonian professor of psychology and longtime chair of psychology at the University of Tartu. He is best known for his work on the history of experimental psychology.

Ramul believed that history is dependent upon psychology, though the philosopher of science Ernest Nagel criticized him for "not stat[ing] clearly the type of psychological investigation which is relevant to the historian's task" (Nagel 1934, pp. 599–600).

== Selected publications ==
- Ramul, Konstantin (1936). "Psychologie und Geschichte". Archiv für die gesamte Psychologie (in German). 95 (1–2): 1–14.
- Ramul, Konstantin (1960). "The Problem of Measurement in the Psychology of the Eighteenth Century". American Psychologist. 15 (4): 256–265. doi:10.1037/h0047753.
- Ramul, Konstantin (1974). Iz istorii psikhologii Из истории психологии (in Russian). Tartu: Tartuskij gosudarstvennyj universitet. OCLC 23151559.
