= Konstantinovsky =

Konstantinovsky (masculine), Konstantinovskaya (feminine), or Konstantinovskoye (neuter) may refer to:

- Konstantinovsky District, several districts in Russia
- Konstantinovskoye Urban Settlement, an administrative division and a municipal formation which the town of Konstantinovsk and five rural localities in Konstantinovsky District of Rostov Oblast, Russia are incorporated as
- Konstantinovsky (inhabited locality) (Konstantinovskaya, Konstantinovskoye), several inhabited localities in Russia
- Constantine Palace (Konstantinovsky dvorets), a palace in Strelna, Russia
- Konstantinovskoye Municipal Okrug, a municipal okrug of Krasnoselsky District in the federal city of St. Petersburg, Russia
- Vyacheslav Leonidovych Konstantinovsky is a Ukrainian businessman, politician, and former member of the Ukrainian parliament.
