= Constantine Overton =

Constantine Overton (1626/7—c. 1700?), was an English Quaker leader, trading as a grocer, in Shrewsbury, Shropshire, England. Imprisoned and fined for his beliefs, attendance at Quaker Meetings for Worship, refusing to pay tithes to Church of England parishes, and not taking off his hat in Court and opening his shop on 25th of the Twelfth month (i.e. Christmas Day). He is sometimes known as "Constant Overton".

His first prosecution, during the English Commonwealth of Oliver Cromwell, was by a Church of England priest who objected to the outdoor preaching of Quakers meeting outside the parish church of Cressage near Shrewsbury on 5 October 1656. He and six others who were present were ultimately brought before Bridgnorth Assizes, where they were fined for contempt of court in refusing to remove hats. They were each fined £40 and remained in prison for three months until the fines were paid. He was one of the signatories (as Constant Overton) of a printed account of the case, published in London in 1657.

After the restoration of the Stuart monarchy in 1660, he had further imprisonments and fines as late as the 1670s. In 1675 the Society of Friends appointed Overton as one of the representatives in Shropshire to meet to report on persecutions of their co-religionists.

Overton is known to have been alive as late as c. 1700, when, aged seventy-three, he emigrated to Pennsylvania in British North America (later part of the U.S.A.) with the help of money raised by fellow Quakers in Shropshire, and the Welsh counties of Montgomeryshire and Merionethshire.
