= Konstantinos Versis =

Greek army officer

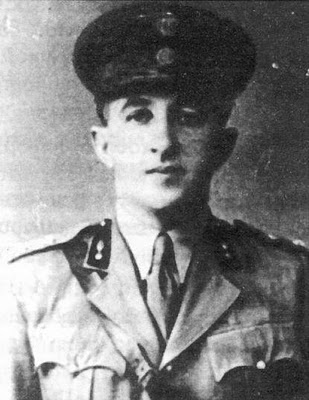
- Born: 1901; Athens, Greece
- Died: 1941 (aged 39–40); Rapsista, Ioannina, Greece
- Military career
- Allegiance: Greece
- Branch: Greek Army
- Service years: 1922–1941
- Rank: Major
- Conflicts: Greco-Turkish War (1919–1922); Greco-Italian War; German invasion of Greece

Konstantinos Versis (Greek: Κωνσταντίνος Βερσής, 1901–1941) was a Greek Army officer and the hero of World War II.

== Life ==
Versis was born in Athens in 1901. As a 2nd Lieutenant in the Greek Artillery, he participated in the Greco-Turkish War, in the final year of operations, which was 1922. He distinguished himself on the battlefield, according to war records.

When Greece joined World War II on 28 October 1940, he was positioned at Epirus, as a commander of the 1st Battery of the Vth Artillery Regiment, part of the 8th Infantry Division. During the Fascist Italian invasion at the sector of Elaia–Kalamas, he participated in the defense and his battery inflicted serious damage to the attacking enemy, who was soon repulsed from Greek soil. During the following months he participated in the counter offensive, which resulted in the successful advance of the Greek forces deep into enemy-held territory.

After the German invasion in support of Fascist Italy, in April 1941, the front collapsed and the Greek Army capitulated. As part of the capitulation terms, the Greek soldiers had to surrender their guns to the Germans, on April 26. Versis, who was still positioned in Epirus, rejected such a humiliating turn of events and as a final act of heroism, ordered his men to collect the guns of his battery and then to sing the National Anthem looking south, where the rest of Greece lies. After saluting his guns, he ordered to set them on fire, while during the explosions he committed suicide.

== Legacy ==
In recognition of his distinguished war efforts, the 2010 graduate class of the Evelpidon Military Academy bears his name.
