= Konstantinovka, Tuymazinsky District, Republic of Bashkortostan =

Konstantinovka Константиновка
- Selo
- Location within Bashkortostan Location within Russia
- Coordinates: 54°26′N 53°53′E
- Country: Russia
- Region: Bashkortostan
- District: Tuymazinsky District
- Time zone: UTC+5:00

Konstantinovka (Russian: Константиновка) is a rural locality (a selo) in Nikolayevsky Selsoviet, Tuymazinsky District, Bashkortostan, Russia. The population was 140 as of 2010. There are 3 streets.

== Geography ==
Konstantinovka is located 30 km southeast of Tuymazy (the district's administrative centre) by road. Serafimovka is the nearest rural locality.
