= George Nazos =

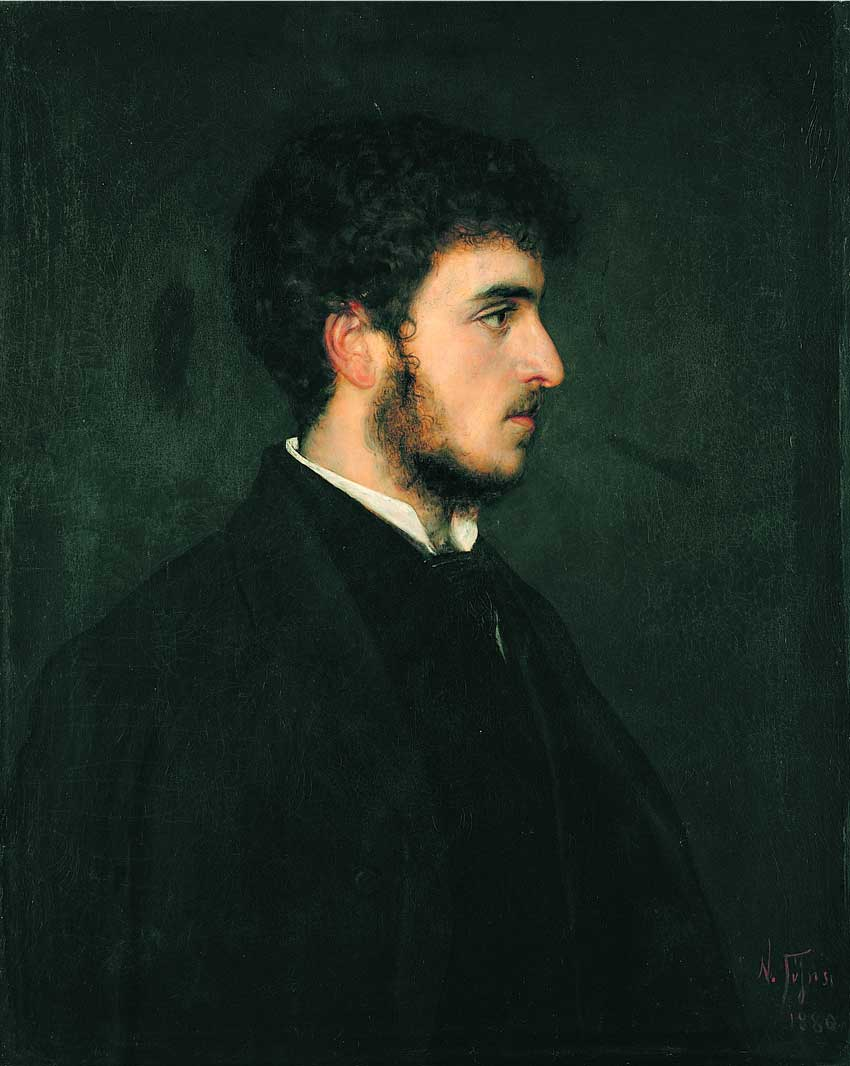
Portrait of George Nazos by Nikolaos Gyzis, 1880.

George Nazos (Greek: Γιώργος Νάζος Giórgios Názos) (1862 – 1934) was a Greek music teacher and director of the Athens Conservatoire. He was from a well-known family from Tinos Island. He was recognized for his musical talent at a young age. In 1881 he went to Munich, German Empire to study piano and advanced theory, returning to Greece in 1886.

== Career ==
In 1891, Nazos was appointed musical director of the Athens Conservatory, which he reorganized by hiring foreign teachers. Specifically, he proceeded to Germanize the curriculum, perhaps influenced by his studies in Munich, and apply progressive educational methods, which led to the founding of the Conservatory's student orchestra, the first incarnation of what was to become the Athens State Orchestra upon nationalization. He also founded or was important to the founding of the Conservatory's drama, opera, Byzantine, and military band departments, and contributed to Greek legislation pertaining to music education. As a teacher, he taught in piano, voice, and music theory.

In his field, he dealt with scientific research and the collection of Greek traditional songs from the Peloponnesus and Crete. This research work was published in Athens under the title of Peninta dimódi ásmata Peloponnisou kai Kritis (Fifty traditional songs from Peloponnesus and Crete).

Nazos was a dedicated professional musician, and his contribution to conservatories, schools, orchestras, and theatre was significant. Through 30 years of effort, he laid the foundations of Greek music education.
