= Psychological Trauma: Theory, Research, Practice, and Policy =

- Language: English
- Edited by: Kathleen Kendall-Tackett

Publication details
- History: 2009-present
- Publisher: American Psychological Association (United States)
- Frequency: Bimonthly
- Impact factor: 3.226 (2020)

Standard abbreviations
- ISO 4: Psychol. Trauma

Indexing
- ISSN: 1942-9681 (print); 1942-969X (web)

Links
- Journal homepage; Online access

Psychological Trauma: Theory, Research, Practice, and Policy is a peer-reviewed academic journal published by the American Psychological Association on behalf of Division 56. It was established in 2009 and covers research on the psychological effects of trauma. The incoming editor-in-chief is Kathleen Kendall-Tackett of Texas Tech University School of Medicine.

== Abstracting and indexing ==
The journal is abstracted and indexed by the Social Sciences Citation Index. According to the Journal Citation Reports, the journal has a 2020 impact factor of 3.226.
