= Kostas Biris =

Konstantinos "Kostas" Biris (Greek: Κωνσταντίνος "Κώστας" Μπίρης; 1899–1980) was a Greek architect, city planner and folklorist. He was born in Cairo but grew up in Euboea; he graduated from NTUA in 1921.

== Books ==
- 1946, Reconstruction plan for the Capital city
  - includes a plan for a unified archaeological park, on the areas of Acropolis, Plaka, Dimosiou Simatos and Iera Odos
- 1957, History of the NTUA
- 1958, For modern Athens, studies and contests
- 1960, Arvanites
- 1966, Athens from the 19th to the 20th century

== See also ==
- Arvanites
