= Constantin =

Male given name

- Pronunciation: Romanian: [konstanˈtin]
- Gender: Male

Origin
- Origin: Latin
- Meaning: "constant, steadfast"

Other names
- Nicknames: Costel, Costin, Costinel, Kosta
- Derived: Constantinus
- Related names: Constantinus, Constantine

Constantin is an Aromanian, Megleno-Romanian and Romanian male given name. It can also be a surname.

For a list of notable people called Constantin, see Constantine (name).

== See also ==
- Constantine (name)
- Konstantin
