= Kosta Alković =

Serbian academic

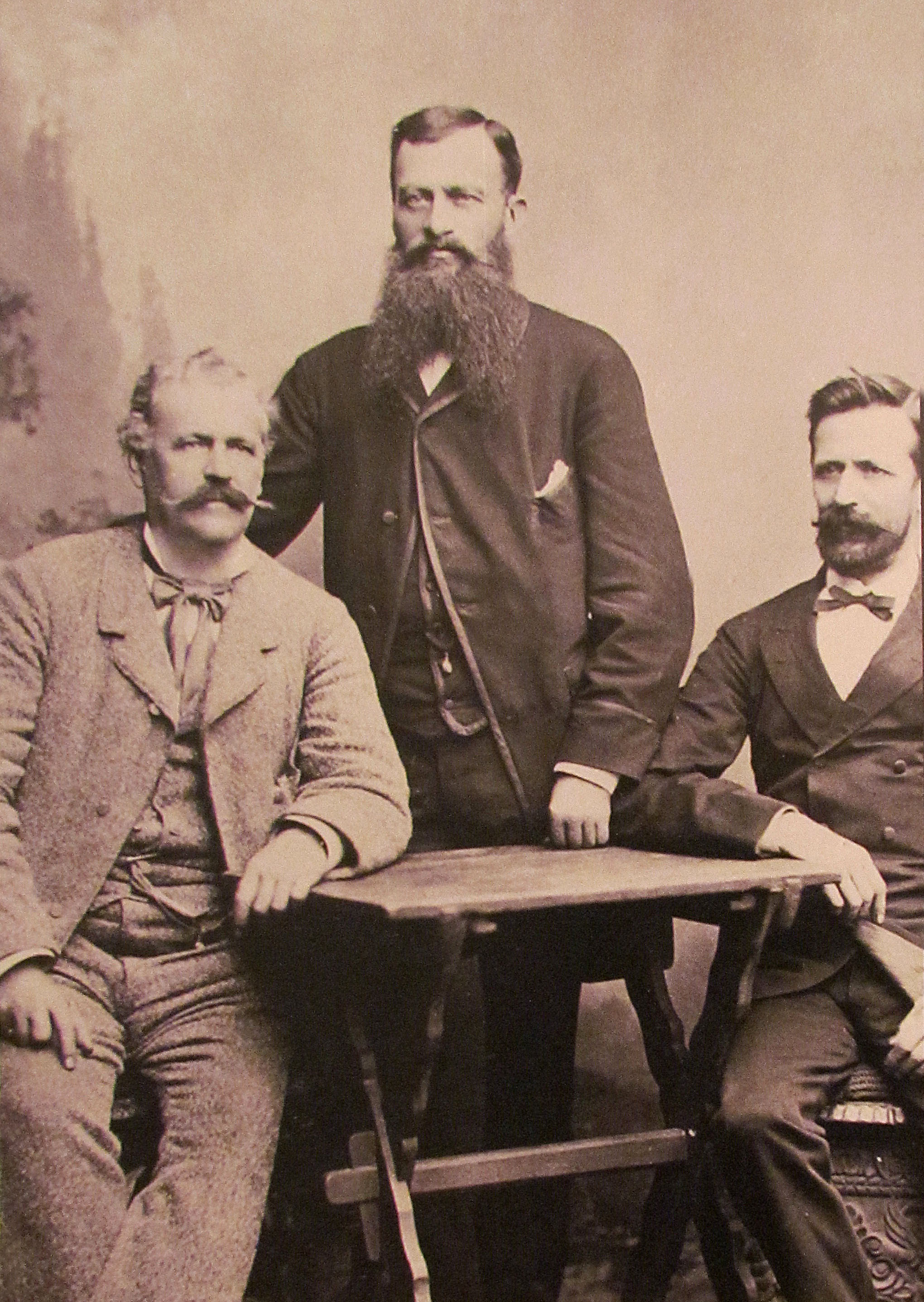
Kosta Alkovic, Ljubomir Kleric and Dimitrije Nesic

Kostantin "Kosta" Alković (Serbian Cyrillic: Коста Алковић; 14 September 1834 – 2 May 1909) was a Serbian physicist and university professor, state advisor and politician. He was professor of physics and mechanics from 1863 to 1892 at the Belgrade College, He served as the Minister of Construction in 1892–1893. He was also a member of the Serbian Academy of Arts and Sciences.

== Biography ==
Kosta Alković was born in Zemun, at the time in the Austrian Empire (now Serbia) on 14 September 1834. After graduating from the Belgrade Lyceum, he received a state scholarship to pursue further studies at the Vienna Polytechnic Institute. He graduated in 1859 with a degree in mathematics, physics, mechanics and practical geometry from the Vienna Polytechnic. He was professor of physics and mechanics at the Lyceum and the Velika škola (from 1862 deputy, and professor from 26 September 1863 to 1893); dean of the Technical Department of the Velika škola (1868); rector of the Velika škola (1885/1886 and 1891/92); regular member of the Serbian Academic Society; honorary member of the Serbian Royal Academy (1892); Minister of Construction of Serbia (from 9 August 1891 to 8 March 1893); and Deputy Minister of Education and Church Affairs (from 26 December 1892 to 4 January 1893).

== Career ==
Kosta Alković did not write textbooks or scientific papers, but he still followed scientific and technical achievements and tried to improve the physical cabinet with useful literature, including travel writing.

After returning from his studies abroad in Serbia in 1862, he was appointed deputy of the vacant chair of physics at the Belgrade Lyceum, and in 1863 he was appointed one of the ten professors of physics at the Belgrade Velika škola. In addition to physics, he taught mechanics, and from the same year he also taught elements of meteorology and physical geography at the Military Academy. During his work, he was also the director of the physical cabinet. He celebrated a rare jubilee in 1887 – the 25th anniversary of his professorship at the Velika škola. From 1863 to 1892 he was a professor of physics at the Belgrade's Velika škola. From 1893, his work was continued by his students and colleagues Djordje Stanojevic and Milan Nedeljković. As the Minister of Construction from 21 August 1892 to 20 March 1893, in the government of Jovan Avakumović, he was awarded the Order of Saint Sava. He later served as an adviser to the Serbian government. He was highly decorated for his participation in the Serbian–Ottoman wars of 1876–1878. In February 1870, he became a regular member of the Serbian Academic Society, and served as secretary of the Committee for Natural and Mathematical Sciences 1879/1880. In November 1892, he became an honorary member of the Serbian Royal Academy.

Konstantin Kosta Alković died on 2 May 1909 (Julian Calendar) in Belgrade.
