= Vladimir Konstantinov (pilot) =

Aviator

- Владимир Фёдорович Константинов
- Born: 22 February 1921; Nigeryovo village, Tver Governorate, Russian SFSR
- Died: 15 July 1979 (aged 58); Moscow, USSR
- Relatives: Tamara Konstantinova (sister)
- Military career
- Allegiance: Soviet Union
- Branch: Soviet Air Force
- Service years: 1939–1976
- Rank: Colonel
- Conflicts: World War II
- Awards: Hero of the Soviet Union

Vladimir Fyodorovich Konstantinov (Russian: Владимир Фёдорович Константинов; 22 February 1921 – 15 July 1979) was a Soviet bomber and ground attack pilot during World War II. Awarded the title Hero of the Soviet Union in 1944 for his sorties on a Po-2 night bomber, he went on to hold various posts in assault and fighter-bomber aviation regiments, and achieved the rank of colonel in 1969. His sister, Tamara Konstantinova, an Il-2 pilot during the war, was also awarded the title Hero of the Soviet Union.
