= Constans Pontin =

Swedish journalist and author

Erik Magnus Constans Pontin (19 April 1819, Stockholm – 30 September 1852, Kalmar) was a Swedish journalist and author. He was the son of Magnus Martin af Pontin.

== Biography ==
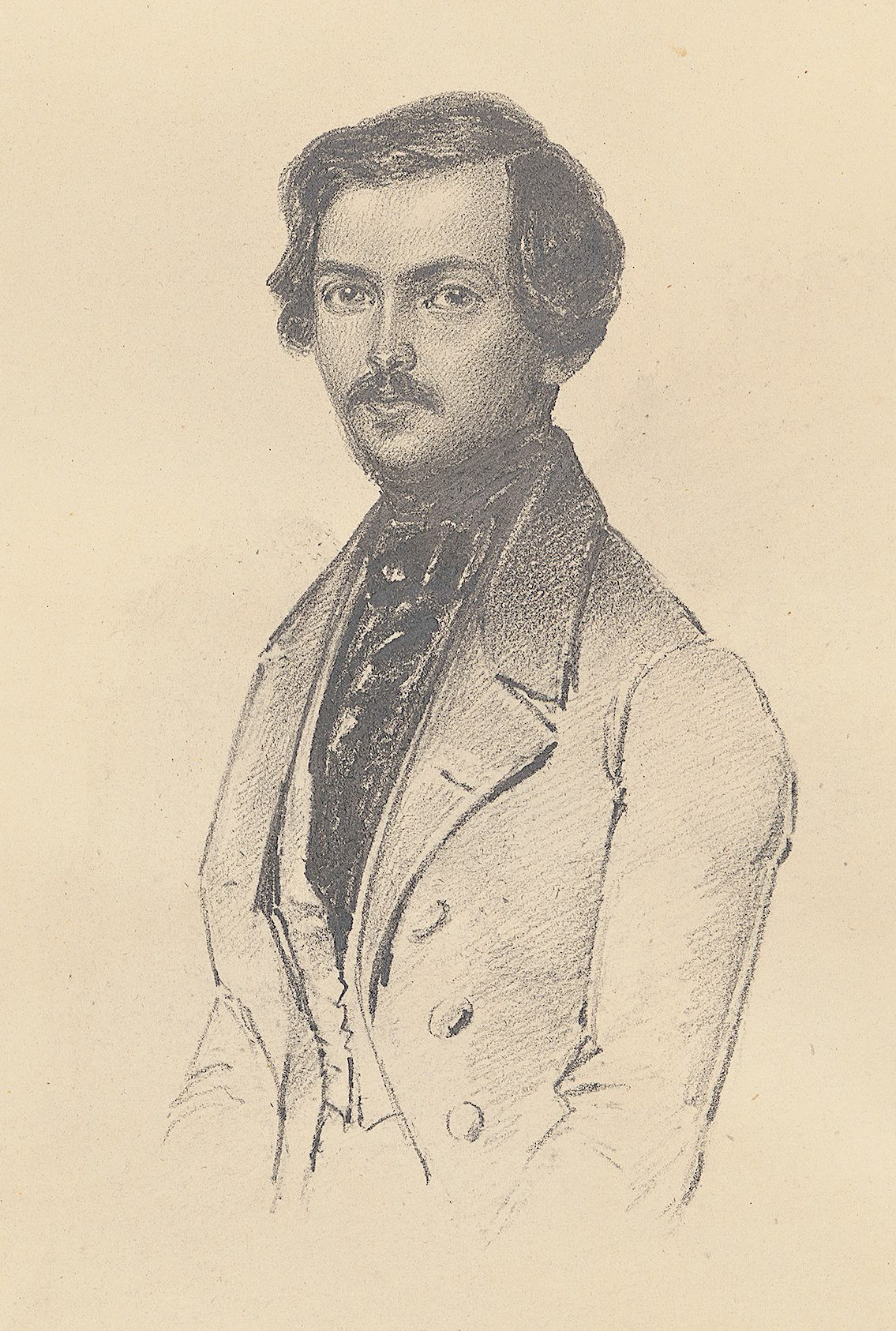
Constans Pontin by Röhl 1842

Pontin graduated from the Uppsala University in 1837 and shortly afterwards published his translation of Alexis de Tocqueville's Democracy in America. After getting his law degree, he published Förr och nu i Vadstena (1846) and Äreminne öfver E. Dahlberg (1847). These were followed by the novel Lydia (1847), the novella Hög och låg (1850), and the play Agda (1850).
