= Lyolya Boguzokova =

Soviet gunner and radio operator

Lyolya Magometovna Boguzokova
- Лолэ Мухьэмэд ыпхъу Бэгъужъэкъу
- Born: 15 February 1922; Lakshukay aul, South Russia (located in present-day Republic of Adygea, Russian Federation)
- Died: 24 September 1951 (aged 29); Moscow, Soviet Union
- Military career
- Allegiance: Soviet Union
- Branch: Soviet Air Force
- Rank: Major
- Unit: 765th Assault Aviation Regiment
- Conflicts: World War II
- Awards: Order of the Patriotic War; Order of the Red Star

Lyolya Magometovna Boguzokova (Adyghe: Лолэ Мухьэмэд ыпхъу Бэгъужъэкъу, Russian: Лёля Магометовна Богузокова; 15 February 1922 – 24 September 1951) was a gunner and radio operator on an Ilyushin Il-2 of the Soviet Air Forces during World War II who completed 59 missions and received commendation from Stalin. She was also the first Adygean woman aviator.

== Early life ==
Boguzokova was raised by her aunt and uncle after her father was repressed in the 1930s while her mother worked in Krasnodar. After completing secondary school with excellent marks she moved to the city of Maykop where she studied at a local aeroclub since she was a member of the Komsomol while a student at pedagogical school. She had been inspired to become a pilot from reading in newspapers about the feat of women pilots Valentina Grizodubova, Polina Osipenko, and Marina Raskova. After completing pedagogical school she began working as a teacher in the Chechen-Ingush ASSR, and in May 1942 she was appointed as the director of the Novo-Atagin school, but was evacuated from the area in August that same year due to the war.

== World War II ==
After being evacuated from the warfront she sent in a request to be allowed to join the air force. Her request was granted in 1943, and in November she was assigned to fly as a radio operator and gunner in the 765th Assault Aviation Regiment. She flew in her first ground-attack sortie on the North Caucasian Front. In the middle of the war she married pilot Pyotr Likarenko, and after their wedding ceremony they painted “From Moscow to Berlin” on the side of one of the regiment's aircraft. They had met when Pyotr completed pilot training and was informed, to his disbelief, that she would be his radio operator and gunner. Lyolya went on to fly ground-attack missions with her husband, even while she was pregnant with their son Igor during the Battle of Berlin. During the war she completed 59 combat missions, engaged in five dogfights and shot down two enemy aircraft in the process.

== Personal life ==
After the war Boguzokova returned to the field of education, and after continuing her schooling at a pedagogical institute she became a Russian language teacher in Moscow. On 24 September 1951 she died from Leukemia and was buried in the Khatukai aul, her mother's hometown. Her son Igor followed in her footsteps and also held a career in military aviation, reaching the rank of colonel.

== Awards ==
- Order of the Patriotic War 2nd class (1945)
- Order of the Red Star (1945)
- Medal "For Courage" (1943)
- campaign medals
