= Lidiya Shulaykina =

- Лидия Ивановна Шулайкина
- Born: 28 March [O.S. 15 March] 1915; Orekhovo-Zuyevo, Russian Empire
- Died: 22 June 1995 (aged 80); Moscow, Russian Federation
- Military career
- Allegiance: Soviet Union
- Branch: Soviet Navy
- Service years: 1942 – 1955
- Rank: Senior Lieutenant
- Unit: 7th Guards Attack Aviation Regiment
- Conflicts: World War II
- Awards: Hero of the Russian Federation

Lidiya Ivanovna Shulaykina (Russian: Лидия Ивановна Шулайкина; 28 March [O.S. 15 March] 1915 – 22 June 1995) was one of the few women Ilyushin Il-2 pilots and the only female ground-attack pilot in naval aviation during the Second World War. In 1993 she was awarded the title Hero of the Russian Federation.

== Early life ==
Shulaykina was born in 1915 to a Russian family in Orekhovo-Zuyevo near Moscow. After completing her seventh grade of school in 1930 she went on to attend the Moscow Industrial and Pedagogical College, which she graduated from in 1933. From then she worked as a schoolteacher until 1939, having moved on to work as a flight instructor full time. While a teacher, she trained at her local aeroclub, graduating in 1937 and then working as a flight instructor in addition to her teaching job. After her husband, Sergey Kiryushkin, graduated from the Kachin flying school and was sent to the Caucasus, she came with him and gave birth to their daughter Tamara in 1940. Until May 1941, she worked for the Civil Air Fleet in Abkhazia, after which she briefly taught pilots at an aeroclub in the Moscow area. However, she soon had to relocate again, when the flight school had to be moved to Udmurtia after the German invasion of the Soviet Union.

== World War II ==
Shortly after receiving a notice that her husband died in 1942, Shulaykina volunteered for the military and was originally posted as a flight instructor, but after repeated requests to be sent to the front lines she was sent to learn to fly the Il-2 at the 3rd Naval Aviation School, and graduated from training in August 1944. From then until May 1945 she served in the 7th Guards Attack Aviation Regiment under the command of twice Hero of the Soviet Union Aleksey Mazurenko. She saw heavy combat in the battle of Königsberg; in total she flew 30 sorties on the Il-2, successfully destroying various vessels and inflicting damage on important targets. At the time she was the only female ground-attack pilot in Soviet naval aviation.

== Postwar ==
Remaining in the air force for ten years after the war, Shulaykina became a Li-2 pilot, flying with the 81st Separate Transport Aviation Squadron from July 1947 to September 1951 and then the 65th Separate Transport Aviation Regiment until leaving the military in 1955. Living in Moscow with her husband, whom she married in 1949, she worked as a home economics teacher at a high school and later as an English teacher after graduating from the faculty of foreign languages of the Moscow Pedagogical Institute. In 1990 she retired from teaching before she died on 22 June 1995 and was buried in the Dolgoprudnensky Cemetery.

== Awards ==
- Hero of the Russian Federation (1 October 1993)
- Two Order of the Red Banner (1 November 1944 and 23 May 1945)
- Medal "For Military Merit" (26 February 1953)
- Order of the Patriotic War 1st class (11 March 1985)
- campaign and jubilee medals

== See also ==
- List of female Heroes of the Russian Federation
