= List of émigré musicians from Nazi Europe who settled in Britain =

The rise of Nazism and its aftermath led to a wave of Central European intellectuals, many of them Jewish, seeking escape abroad during the 1930s and 1940s due to persecution at home. It has been claimed that nearly 70 composers came to the UK to escape Nazi persecution between 1933 and 1945, though many of them subsequently moved on elsewhere. This list details those composers, performers, publishers and musicologists who ended up living and working in Britain, where they had a significant and lasting influence on musical culture and development - though often at considerable personal and professional cost, with much of their legacies lost.

== Primarily composers ==
- Ernest Berk (1909–1994). Arrived 1934 from Germany, returned mid-1980s.
- Boaz Bischofswerder (1885–1946). Arrived 1933 from Germany. Deported as an enemy alien to Australia in 1940 with his son Felix Werder
- Nicholas Brodszky (1905–1958). Arrived from Austria 1939, moved on to California 1949
- Francis Chagrin (1905–1972). Arrived 1936 from Romania (via France)
- Erika Fox (born 1936). Arrived 1939 from Austria
- Hans Gál (1890–1987). Arrived 1938 from Austria
- Peter Gellhorn (1912–2014). Arrived 1935 from Germany
- Roberto Gerhard (1896–1970). Arrived 1939 from Spain (via France)
- Berthold Goldschmidt (1903–1996). Arrived 1935 from Germany
- Allan Gray (real name Josef Zmigrod, 1902–1973). Arrived 1935 from Austria
- Wilhelm Grosz (1894–1939). Arrived 1934 from Austria (moved onto the US, 1938)
- Joseph Horovitz (1926–2022). Arrived 1938 from Austria
- Robert Kahn (1865–1951). Arrived 1938 from Germany
- Erwin Lendvai (1882–1949). Arrived 1933 from Germany
- Ray Martin, (real name Kurt Kohn, 1918–1988). Arrived 1938 from Austria
- Hans May (1886–1959). Arrived 1936 from Germany (via Paris), returned to Europe 1957
- Ernst Meyer (1905–1988). Arrived 1933 from Germany, returned 1948
- Karl Rankl (1898–1968). Arrived 1939 from Austria
- Franz Reizenstein (1911–1968). Arrived 1934 from Germany
- Mátyás Seiber (1905–1960). Arrived 1935 from Hungary
- Leopold Spinner (1906–1980). Arrived 1939 from Austria
- Mischa Spoliansky (1898–1985). Arrived 1933 from Germany
- Peter Ury (1920–1976). Arrived 1939 from Germany
- Egon Wellesz (1885–1974). Arrived 1938 from Austria
- Arthur Willner (1881–1959). Arrived 1938 from Austria

Other composers stayed for a short time in Britain before moving on elsewhere. They included Hanns Eisler, Ernst Krenek, Karol Rathaus, Kurt Roger, Ernst Toch and Kurt Weill

== Primarily conductors, performers, teachers ==
- Oskar Adler (1875–1955). Arrived 1938 from Austria
- Amadeus Quartet (three members of). Arrived 1938 from Austria
- Friedrich Buxbaum (1869–1948). Arrived 1938 from Austria
- Peter Ebert (1918–2012). Arrived 1933 from Germany
- Líza Fuchsová (1913–1977). Arrived 1939 from Czechoslovakia
- Elena Gerhardt (1883–1961). Arrived 1935 from Germany
- Walter Goehr (1903–1960). Arrived 1933 from Germany
- Michael Graubart (1930-2024). Arrived 1938 from Austria
- Erich Gruenberg (1924–2020). Arrived 1946 from Austria (via Israel, 1938)
- Paul Hamburger (1920–2004). Arrived 1939 from Austria
- Karl Haas (1900–1970). Arrived 1939 from Germany
- Hans Heimler (1913–1990). Arrived 1938 from Vienna
- Helene Isepp (1899–1968). Arrived 1938 from Austria
- Martin Isepp (1930–2011). Arrived 1938 from Austria
- Julius Isserlis (1888–1968). Arrived 1938 from Austria
- Susi Jeans (1911–1993). Arrived 1935 from Austria
- Louis Kentner (1905–1987). Arrived 1935 from Hungary
- Anita Lasker-Wallfisch (born 1925). Arrived in 1946 after liberation from Belsen
- Maria Lidka (1914–2013). Arrived 1934 from Germany
- Hans Oppenheim (1892–1965). Arrived 1935 from Germany
- Rawicz and Landauer, piano duo. Arrived 1935 from Austria
- Arnold Rosé (1863–1946). Arrived 1938 from Austria
- Max Rostal (1905–1991). Arrived 1934 from Germany
- Ferdinand Rauter (1902–1987) Arrived 1929 from Austria (via Denmark)
- Rudolf Schwarz (1905–1994). Arrived from imprisonment in Germany (via Sweden) in 1947
- Jan Sedivka (1917–2009). Arrived 1942 from Czechoslovakia
- Bruno Schrecker (1928–2026). Arrived 1935 from Czechoslovakia
- Walter Susskind (1913-1980). Arrived 1939 from Czechoslovakia, from 1952 worked mostly abroad
- Richard Tauber (1891–1948). Left Austria 1938, British citizenship gained in March 1940
- Vilém Tauský (1910–2004). Arrived 1940 from Czechoslovakia (via France)
- Edith Vogel (1912–1992). Arrived 1938 from Austria
- Ilse Wolf (1921–1999). Arrived 1939 from Germany
- Leo Wurmser (1905–1967). Arrived 1938, from Vienna

Pianist Artur Schnabel and cellists Fritz Ball and Emanuel Feuermann stayed for a short time in Britain before moving on

== Primarily critics or musicologists ==
- Theodor Adorno (1903–1969) arrived 1934 from Germany (with frequent trips back) but moved on to New York in 1938
- Mosco Carner (1904–1985). Arrived 1933 from Poland
- Otto Erich Deutsch (1883–1967). Arrived 1939, returned to Vienna 1951
- Erich von Hornbostel (1877–1935). Arrived 1933 from Austria
- Hans Keller (1919–1985). Arrived 1938 from Austria
- Georg Knepler (1906-2003). Arrived from Austria in 1934, returned in 1946
- Else Mayer-Lissmann (1914–1990). Arrived 1938 from Germany
- Hans Redlich (1903–1968). Arrived 1939, from Germany
- Fritz Spiegl (19263–2003). Arrived 1939, from Austria
- Peter Stadlen (1910–1996). Arrived 1938 from Austria
- Erwin Stein (1885–1958). Arrived 1938 from Austria
- Klaus Wachsmann (1907–1984). Arrived 1936 from Germany. Uganda (1937-57), UK (1957-63), US (1963-75), UK (1975-84)

== Primarily publishers ==
- Adolf Aber (1893–1960). Arrived from Germany, 1933, worked at Novello
- Walter Bergmann (1902–1988). Arrived from Germany, 1939, worked at Schott
- Otto Blau (1893–1980). Arrived 1938 from Austria, worked at Josef Weinberger
- Alfred Kalmus (1889–1972). Arrived 1936 from Austria, worked at Universal Edition
- Edward Kassner (1920-1996). Arrived 1938 from Austria, Kassner Music
- Ernst Roth (1896–1971). Arrived 1938 from Austria, worked at Boosey & Hawkes

== Sources ==
- Bergfelder, Tim & Cargnelli, Christian. Destination London: German-speaking emigrés and British cinema, 1925–1950 (2008).
- Bratby, Richard. 'The musical émigrés from Nazi-Europe who shaped postwar Britain', in The Spectator, 18 February, 2023.
- Britten, Tony. Through Lotte's Lens: a film by Tony Britten (2018).
- Crawford: Dorothy L. A windfall of musicians: Hitler's émigrés and exiles in southern California (2009)
- Gal, Hans. Music Behind Barbed Wire: A Diary of Summer, 1940 (2014).
- Gordon, David and Peter. Musical Visitors to Britain (2005).
- Haas, Michael. Forbidden Music: The Jewish Composers Banned by the Nazis. New Haven and London: Yale University Press (2013). ISBN 978-0-300-15430-6 (cloth); ISBN 978-0-300-15431-3 (pbk).
- Haas, Michael. Music of Exile: The Untold Story of the Composers who Fled Hitler, Yale University Press (2023). ISBN 978-0-300-26650-4
- Hirschfeld, G. and others. Second Chance: Two Centuries of German-speaking Jews in the United Kingdom (1991).
- Levi, Erik. 'The German-Jewish Contribution to Musical Life in Britain', in Second Chance: Two Centuries of German-speaking Jews in the United Kingdom (1991), pp. 275-295.
- Miller, Malcolm and Hansen, Jutta Raab. Music in Exile: from 1933 to the Present Day. The Yearbook of the Research Centre for German and Austrian Exile Studies, Vol. 22 (2023)
- Oldfield, Sybil. The Black Book: The Britons on the Nazi Hitlist (2020).
- ORT. Music and the Holocaust: Composers in Exile.
- Royal College of Music. Project celebrating the work of migrant musicians who fled the Nazis.
- Royal College of Music. Singing a Song in a Foreign Land, Symposium programme, February 2014.
- Snowman, Daniel, The Hitler Emigrés (2002).
