= Second Viennese School =

Group of composers in 20th century Vienna

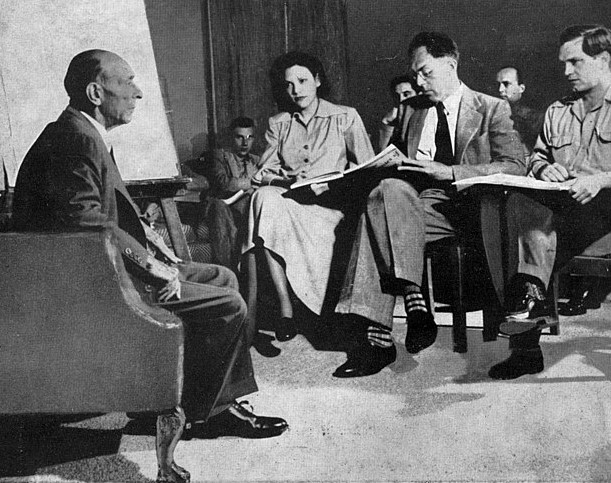
Arnold Schoenberg c. 1944-48

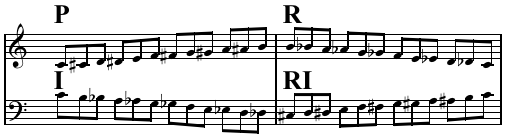
Prime, retrograde, inverse, and retrograde-inverse permutations.

The Second Viennese School (German: Zweite Wiener Schule, Neue Wiener Schule) was a group of composers that comprised Arnold Schoenberg and his pupils, particularly Alban Berg and Anton Webern, and close associates in early 20th-century Vienna. Their music was initially characterized by late-Romantic expanded tonality and later, a totally chromatic expressionism without a firm tonal centre, often referred to as atonality; and later still, Schoenberg's serial twelve-tone technique. Using this technique when composing, Schoenberg employed all 12 tones present in Western music's chromatic scale when forming a melody, this melody being the "prime series". This method would later be enhanced in compositions by Schoenberg and his followers through permutations such as "retrogrades", "inversions", "transformations" etc.

Later, composers such as Pierre Boulez drew influence from Schoenberg's technique in furthering serialization; serializing not only pitch but rhythm, articulation, and dynamics as well. Theodor Adorno said that the twelve-tone method, when it had evolved into maturity, was a "veritable message in a bottle", addressed to an unknown and uncertain future. Though this common development took place, it neither followed a common time-line nor a cooperative path. Likewise, it was not a direct result of Schoenberg's teaching—which, as his various published textbooks demonstrate, was highly traditional and conservative. Schoenberg's textbooks also reveal that the Second Viennese School spawned not from the development of his serial method, but rather from the influence of his creative example.

== Members ==
The principal members of the school, besides Schoenberg, were Alban Berg and Anton Webern, who were among his first composition pupils. Both of them had already produced copious and talented music in a late Romantic idiom but felt they gained new direction and discipline from Schoenberg's teaching. Other members of this generation included Ernst Krenek, Heinrich Jalowetz, Erwin Stein and Egon Wellesz, and somewhat later Eduard Steuermann, Hanns Eisler, Robert Gerhard, Norbert von Hannenheim, Rudolf Kolisch, Paul A. Pisk, Karl Rankl, Josef Rufer, Nikos Skalkottas, Viktor Ullmann, and Winfried Zillig. Schoenberg's brother-in-law Alexander Zemlinsky is sometimes included as part of the Second Viennese School, though he was never Schoenberg's pupil and never renounced a traditional conception of tonality.

Though Berg and Webern both followed Schoenberg into tonal chromaticism and both, each in his own way, adopted twelve-tone technique soon after he did, not all of these others did so, or waited for a considerable time before following suit. Several later disciples, such as Zillig, the Catalan Gerhard, the Transylvanian Hannenheim and the Greek Skalkottas, are sometimes covered by the term, though (apart from Gerhard) they never studied in Vienna but as part of Schoenberg's masterclass in Berlin.

Membership in the school is not generally extended to Schoenberg's many pupils in the United States from 1933, such as John Cage, Leon Kirchner and Gerald Strang, nor to many other composers who, at a greater remove, wrote compositions evocative of the Second Viennese style, such as the Canadian pianist Glenn Gould. By extension, however, certain pupils of Schoenberg's pupils, such as Berg's pupil Hans Erich Apostel and Webern's pupils René Leibowitz, Leopold Spinner and Ludwig Zenk, are usually included in the roll-call.

The broader circle of the Second Viennese School included, among others, Oskar Adler, Theodor W. Adorno, Hans Erich Apostel, Robert Gerhard, Norbert von Hannenheim, Heinrich Jalowetz, Hanns Jelinek, Sándor Jemnitz, Otto Jokl, Rudolf Kolisch of the Kolisch Quartet, Ernst Krenek, Rita Kurzmann-Leuchter, Erwin Leuchter, Olga Novakovic, Paul Pisk, Rudolf Ploderer, Josef Polnauer, Erwin Ratz, Willi Reich, Josef Rufer, Peter Schacht, Julius Schloss, Nikos Skalkottas, Erwin Stein, Eduard Steuermann, Viktor Ullmann, Rudolf Weirich, Adolph Weiss, Egon Wellesz, Alexander Zemlinsky, and Winfried Zillig.

Contemporaneous performers, friends, admirers, and supporters of the circle at various times included figures as diverse as Guido Adler, David Josef Bach, Ernst Bachrich, Imre [Emerich] Balabán and Béla Bartók of the New Hungarian Music Society, Julius Bittner, Artur Bodanzky, Mark Brunswick, Richard Buhlig, Edward Clark, Henry Cowell, Herbert Eimert, Gottfried Feist, Marya Freund, Felix Galimir of the Galimir Quartet, Rudolph Ganz, George Gershwin, Richard Gerstl, Walter Gropius, Marie Gutheil-Schoder, Alois Hába, Emil Hertzka, Jascha Horenstein, Felicie Hüni-Mihacsek, Erich Itor Kahn, Wassily Kandinsky, Hans Keller, Erich Kleiber, Gustav Klimt, Wilhelm Klitsch, Erich Wolfgang Korngold, Louis Krasner, Józef Koffler, Oskar Kokoschka, René Leibowitz, Erich Leinsdorf, Adolf Loos, Darius Milhaud and Francis Poulenc of Les Six, Elisabeth Lutyens, Gustav and Alma Mahler, Frank Martin, Dimitri Mitropoulos, Soma Morgenstern, Johanna Müller-Hermann, Dika Newlin, Will Ogdon, Max Oppenheimer, Otakar Ostrčil, Maurice Ravel, Rudolph Reti, Luigi Rognoni, Arnold Rosé et al. of the Rosé Quartet, Hans Rosbaud, Nikolai Roslavets et al. of the Association for Contemporary Music, Hermann Scherchen, Egon Schiele, Alfredo Sangiorgi, Alfred Schlee, Erich Schmid, Franz Schreker, Erwin Schulhoff, Eugenie Schwarzwald, Rudolf Serkin, Roger Sessions, Peter Stadlen, Erika Stiedry-Wagner, Igor Stravinsky, Georg Trakl, Edgard Varèse et al. of the International Composers Guild, Steuermann's sister Salka Viertel, Imre Waldbauer et al. of the Waldbauer-Kerpely Quartet, Franz Werfel, Arnold Zweig, and Jung-Wien writers Peter Altenberg, Hermann Bahr, Karl Kraus, and Arthur Schnitzler.

== Practices ==
Though the school included highly distinct musical personalities (the styles of Berg and Webern are in fact very different from each other, and from Schoenberg—for example, only the works of Webern conform to the rule stated by Schoenberg that only a single row be used throughout all movements of a composition—while Gerhard and Skalkottas were closely involved with the folk music of their respective countries) the impression of cohesiveness was enhanced by the literary efforts of some of its members. Wellesz wrote the first book on Schoenberg, who was also the subject of several Festschriftenen put together by his friends and pupils; Rufer and Spinner both wrote books on the technique of twelve-tone composition; and Leibowitz's influential study of Schoenberg, Berg and Webern, Schoenberg et son école, helped to establish the image of a school in the period immediately after World War II in France and abroad. Several of those mentioned (e.g. Jalowetz, Rufer) were also influential as teachers, and others (e.g. Kolisch, Rankl, Stein, Steuermann, Zillig) as performers, in disseminating the ideals, ideas and approved repertoire of the group.

Perhaps the culmination of the school took place at Darmstadt almost immediately after World War II, at the Internationale Ferienkurse für Neue Musik, wherein Schoenberg—who was invited but too ill to travel—was ultimately usurped in musical ideology by the music of his pupil, Webern, as composers and performers from the Second Viennese School (e.g. Leibowitz, Rufer, Adorno, Kolisch, Heiss, Stadlen, Stuckenschmidt, Scherchen) converged with the new serialists (e.g. Boulez, Stockhausen, Maderna, Nono, et al.).

== First Viennese School ==
A few great Classical German composers, like Haydn, Mozart, and Beethoven, are sometimes grouped together into the so-called First Viennese School.

== In art and culture ==
Berg, Schoenberg, and Webern inspired the work of many 20th century composers like Michael Dellaira, Ernst Krenek, René Staar, and writers like William H. Gass, Gert Jonke, Thomas Mann, Thomas Pynchon, and Amelia Rosselli. Erika Fox named her "Malinconia Militare" (2003) after the first line of Rosselli's "Webern Opus 4".

Webern's Op. 27 was used in The Sopranos episode "Bust Out".

== See also ==
- The Skandalkonzert of 31 March 1913
