= Nottingham Symphony Orchestra =

English orchestra

- Orchestra
- Short name: NSO
- Founded: 1933
- Location: Nottingham
- Music director: Mark Prescott
- Website: nottinghamsymphony.org.uk/index.htm

The Nottingham Symphony Orchestra is an amateur orchestra based in the City of Nottingham and a registered charity. It was founded in 1933 by Walter Thomas Gaze Cooper as the Midland Conservatory of Music Orchestra. In 1942 it changed its name to become the Nottingham Symphony Orchestra. Cooper conducted the orchestra for 26 years, attracting well-known guest soloists including tenor John Brecknock, cellist Florence Hooton, and pianists George Hadjinikos, Eric Hope and John Ogdon.

The orchestra's current musical director is Mark Prescott, who was appointed following the retirement of Derek Williams in July 2023. Williams became conductor of the orchestra in 1983. The leader is Tim Boswell.

Although an amateur orchestra, the NSO has the skills and resources to take on mainstream symphonic programming comparable to orchestras in the professional domain: for instance, it performed Shostakovitch's Tenth Symphony in the 2011-2012 season. It is one of two amateur orchestras in the City, the other being the Nottingham Philharmonic Orchestra, founded in 1974 as the Nottingham Sinfonietta.
