= Walter Gaze Cooper =

British classical pianist and composer

Walter Thomas Gaze Cooper (11 June, 1895 – 28 March 1981) was a British pianist, teacher and composer closely associated with musical life in Nottingham in the mid 20th century. He was the founder of the Nottingham Symphony Orchestra and composed over 100 works, including nine symphonies.

== Biography ==
Cooper - known as "GC" by his colleagues - was born in Long Eaton, Derbyshire. His early teachers included Arthur Eaglefield Hull for composition and Frederick Dawson (1868-1940) for piano. He worked in a legal office before the war, and during the war served as an Army driver. After a gas attack he was invalided out. Following this he entered the Royal Academy of Music where he studied with Frederick Moore (piano) and Benjamin Dale (composition).

Private teaching provided an income, and in 1925 Cooper joined the faculty at the Midland Conservatoire of Music, where he founded the orchestra in 1933. This evolved into the Nottingham Symphony Orchestra in 1942. Cooper conducted the orchestra for 26 years, attracting well-known guest soloists including tenor John Brecknock, cellist Florence Hooton, and pianists George Hadjinikos, Eric Hope and John Ogdon. He also lectured on music at University College, Nottingham, and directed the Derby Philharmonic Orchestra for eight years.

== Music ==
He was a prolific composer, often using his own orchestra and local Nottingham musicians to perform his works, but also attracting attention in London and elsewhere. An early success was the Rachmaninov-influenced Piano Concerto No. 1, performed by Dan Godfrey and the Bournemouth Symphony Orchestra in May 1923, with Vera Moore as the soloist.

There are nine symphonies (composed between the 1920s and the 1960s), four Piano Concertos (the second premiered by Líza Fuchsová in 1961 and the third by Joyce Hatto in 1954), a Violin Concerto (1945, performed several times by the Serbian violinist Milan Bratza), a Viola Concerto (performed by Watson Forbes in 1962) and a Serenade for Strings, among much else.

The Five Nocturnes for piano were first performed by Líza Fuchsová in 1949. The choral Symphony No. 4 The West Wind was premiered at the Albert Hall, Nottingham on 19 September 1951 at a Festival of Britain concert. His Missa Brevis was also premiered at the Albert Hall on 17 November 1956 by the Nottingham Harmonic Choir and Orchestra. The Concertino for oboe and strings Op. 78 (1956) was written for and performed by Evelyn Rothwell (Lady Barbirolli). There is a modern recording.

Cooper was interested in promoting music behind the Iron Curtain. The Seventh Symphony Op. 82 The Szezecinie (1959) was premiered in Poland in March 1962 with the composer conducting the Stettin Orchestra. Its first English performance took place in Nottingham in February 1965, and it can be heard on the soundtrack of a film, Nottingham Symphony about life in Nottingham. One of his last works was the Bassoon Concerto, completed in 1977 when the composer was 83 years old.

== Personal life ==
Cooper married Frances Lucy Kirkland and there was one daughter, the artist Sylvia Pike (1928-2014). He was a keen collector of ancient art. For many years they lived at 247 Tamworth Road, Long Eaton. When his wife died in March 1975 he moved to Dolphin Cottage, Hawksworth, where he died, aged 86. His scores are housed in the Nottinghamshire Archive.
