= Anne Naysmith =

British pianist (1937–2015)

- Born: 13 January 1937; Southend-on-Sea, Essex, England
- Died: 10 February 2015 (aged 78); London, England
- Education: Royal Academy of Music
- Occupation: Classical pianist

Anne Margaret Naysmith (née Smith; 13 January 1937 – 10 February 2015) was a British classical pianist who became notable later in life for sleeping rough in Chiswick, West London.

She was born in Southend-on-Sea, Essex, in 1937. Her family moved to Hounslow, West London, when she was eight. The 'Nay' was added much later.

Naysmith studied with Harold Craxton and Líza Fuchsová at the Royal Academy of Music, and gave a well received recital at Wigmore Hall in 1967, but experienced personal difficulties in the late 1960s and was evicted from her house in Prebend Gardens, Chiswick. Following her eviction Naysmith slept in her car, a Ford Consul, for 26 years until 2002 when it was towed away following campaigning from neighbours to have it removed. Naysmith then lived in a handmade shelter next to Stamford Brook Underground station.

The Guardian noted parallels with Mary Shepherd, the subject of Alan Bennett's 1999 play The Lady in the Van, who had also been a classical pianist.

At 01:00 on 10 February 2015 Naysmith died after being struck by a lorry on Chiswick High Road. She was buried at Chiswick New Cemetery on 7 March 2015.
