= Kevin R. Gallagher =

Kevin R. Gallagher is a guitarist who plays both the electric guitar and the classical guitar. As a classical guitarist, he has received top honors at some of the most prestigious guitar competitions in the world, including the 1993 Guitar Foundation of America, the 1994 American String Teachers Association, the 1993 Artists International Competition, and 1997 Francisco Tárrega Guitar Competition in Spain. As an electric guitarist, he is known for transcribing violin music for electric guitar and for founding the avant-rock ensemble Electric Kompany. He has also produced, in cooperation with John Zorn, a music festival titled "Full Force: The New Rock Complexity" that showcases bands that have combined styles such as classical, rock, jazz, and metal. He has produced a CD for Naxos Records titled "Guitar Recital - Music from the Renaissance and Baroque," a duo CD with Antigoni Goni titled "Evocacion," and an EP featuring his work on solo electric guitar and with Electric Kompany.

== Background ==
Gallagher began his musical training with rock guitar, but soon became interested in jazz and classical. He went to study with Benjamin Verdery at Wisconsin Conservatory of Music and Sharon Isbin at the Juilliard School. After winning several major competitions and performing in Spain, Germany, Sweden, Greece, Turkey, Brazil, and England, Gallagher once again became interested in the electric guitar. "Through the 90's I only owned and performed classical guitar. In 1998 I just got the sudden urge to walk into a music shop and try their Les Pauls. I hadn't touched an electric in years. I fell in love with one and bought it on the spot. All the electric guitar techniques I knew came back instantly and my classical technique opened up many more possibilities than I had ever had before."

Gallagher now performs solo music on electric guitar by composers such as Steve Reich and Rob Haskins. With Electric Kompany, he has arranged music by Jacob ter Veldhuis, Marc Mellits, and commissioned music for the quartet. "Performing on classical guitar and electric guitar is very different,' says Gallagher, "but there are similarities in my approach. Sound and color is very important to me. With both styles, I choose sounds depending on the piece and the mood I'm trying to convey. Articulation, dynamics and rhythm are also approached in the same way. Musically, I think my head is the same. Technically, there are a lot of differences. Using a pick is the obvious one, but the electric guitar also requires more string muting to keep the sound under control. There is also the pickup selector, tone controls and the endless variety of programmable effects I can use. So, I have similar musical ideas, but I'm using a different palette to convey them."

== Competition Honors ==
- Guitar Foundation of America (1993)
- American String Teachers Association (1994)
- Artists International Competition (1993)
- Francisco Tárrega Guitar Competition (1997)

== Discography ==
- Guitar Recital - Music from the Renaissance and Baroque (Naxos Records)
- Evocacion (Willow Shade)
- New Interpretations (Willow Shade)
- Music from the Avant-Pop (EP)
