= Emil Hertzka =

Austro-Hungarian music publisher; director of Universal Edition 1907–1932

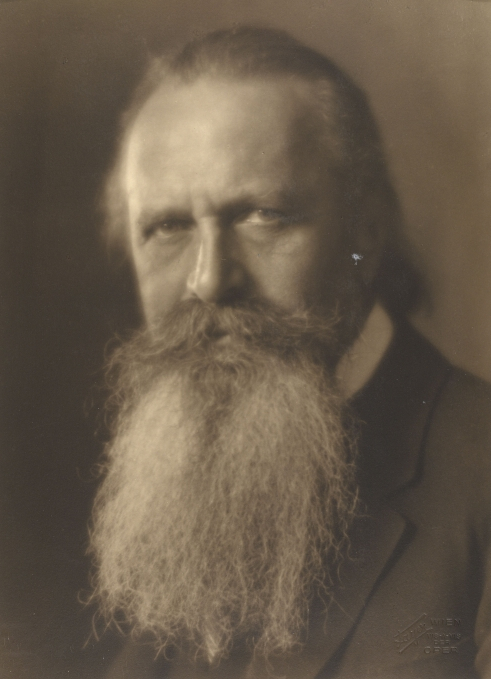
Emil Hertzka (1869–1932)

Emil Hertzka (3 August 1869 – 9 May 1932) was an influential and pioneering music publisher who was responsible for printing and promoting some of the most important European musical works of the 20th century.

== Early life and education ==
Hertzka was born in Budapest. He studied chemistry and music at the University of Vienna.

== Publishing career ==
In 1901 he joined the Vienna-based music publishing house Universal Edition, which had only just been founded. In 1907 he became its director and remained in that position until his death. It was due to Hertzka's efforts that UE came increasingly to concentrate upon the publication of new music, and his voluminous correspondence with many of Europe's leading composers is a valuable resource for modern scholars. By the time of his death in Vienna in 1932, UE's catalogue comprised almost 10.000 items, including works by Gustav Mahler, Arnold Schoenberg, Alban Berg, Anton Webern, Alexander Zemlinsky, Franz Schreker, Alfredo Casella, Leoš Janáček, Karol Szymanowski, Béla Bartók, Zoltán Kodály, Kurt Weill, Hanns Eisler, Ernst Krenek, Darius Milhaud, and Gian Francesco Malipiero.

Hertzka died of a heart attack on May 9, 1932.

Between 1932 and 1938, the Emil Hertzka Foundation offered an annual Composition Prize. This was first awarded in 1933, when it was shared between five composers, namely Roberto Gerhard, Norbert von Hannenheim, Julius Schloss, Ludwing Zenk and Leopold Spinner. The prize went to Joseph Matthias Hauer in 1934; to Viktor Ullmann in 1936, to Hans Erich Apostel in 1937 and to Karl Amadeus Hartmann in 1938. In 1934 Luigi Dallapiccola and Paul Dessau each received a 'Special Acknowledgement'.
