= Notis Mavroudis =

Greek musician (1945–2023)

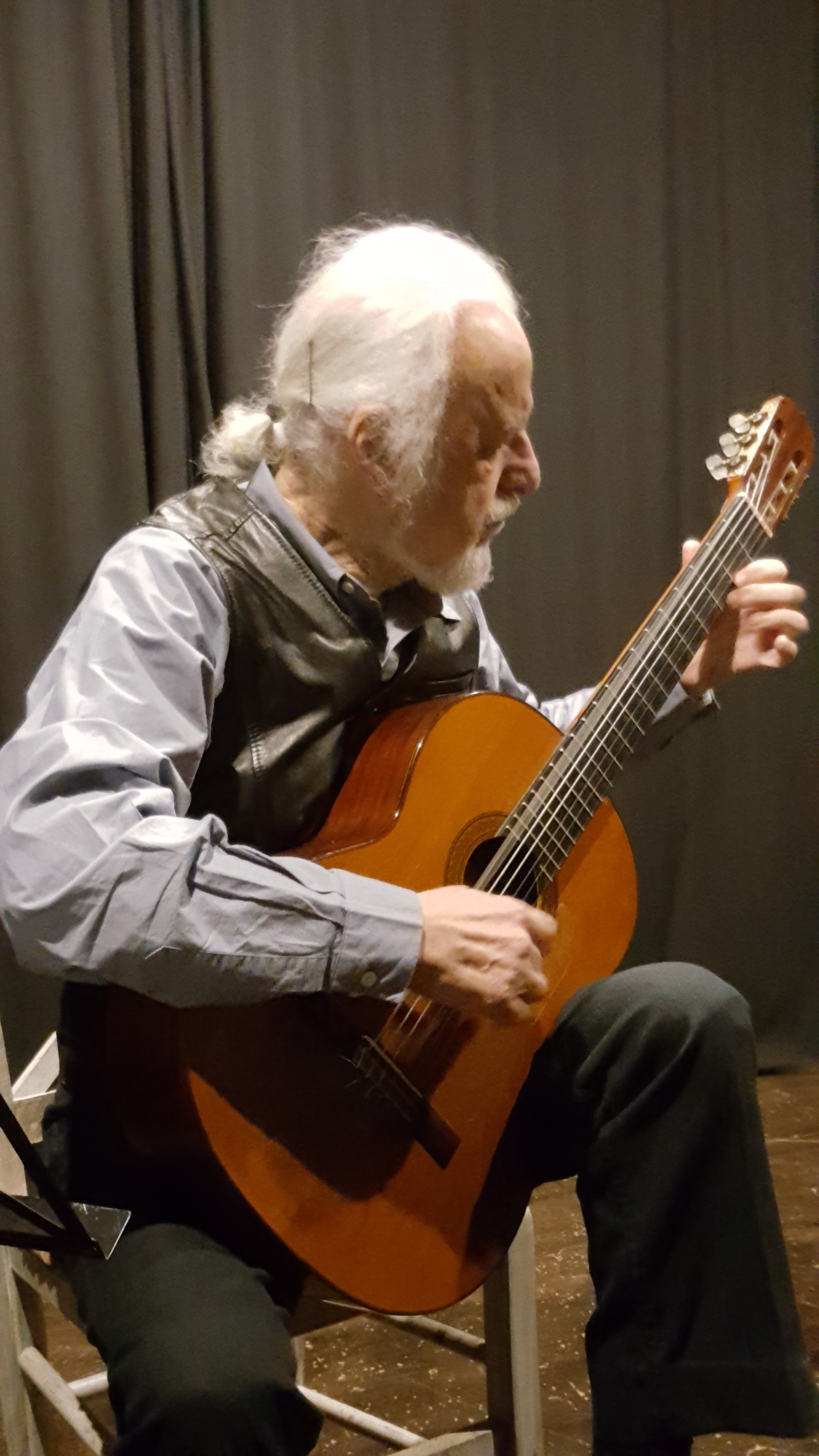
- Born: 15 July 1945; Athens, Greece
- Died: 3 January 2023 (aged 77); Makrinitsa, Greece
- Education: National Conservatory of Athens
- Known for: Classical guitarist, songwriter, composer, teacher
- Spouse: Vaso Dakouri-Mavroudis
- Children: 2

Notis Mavroudis (Greek: Νότης Μαυρουδής; 15 July 1945 – 3 January 2023) was a Greek composer, songwriter, guitarist, columnist and radio producer. He had been active in music creation (composition and songwriting), classical guitar performance and discography since 1964.

== Biography ==
Notis Mavroudis was born in Athens on 15 July 1945. He spent the first two years of his life in prison with his mother, who was a political prisoner after the Greek Civil War. In 1958 he started classical guitar lessons at the National Conservatory of Athens under the tutelage of Dimitris Fampas and graduated in 1969 with honors.

In 1970 he settled in Italy, where he was assigned the classical guitar chair at the Civica Scuola di Musica Claudio Abbado, Milan, where he taught until 1975. In 1970 he also attended the Santiago de Compostela Academy in Spain as a pupil of José Tomás. In 1975 he settled permanently in Athens, and from that year onwards he taught classical guitar at the National Conservatory. In 1975, 1977, and 1979 he gave recitals at the Esztergom Classical Guitar Festival in Hungary. In 1978 he took part in the International Festival of Political Song in East Berlin and the 11th World Youth Festival in Havana, Cuba.

As a composer/songwriter and guitar soloist, he performed in Greece, Italy, Finland, Switzerland, Germany, Hungary, Austria, and Cuba. As a professor at the National Conservatory of Athens, he was the teacher of several popular Greek musicians, such as Manolis Androulidakis, Socrates Malamas, Panagiotis Margaris, Giorgos Melas, Lambros Ntousikos and Dimitris Sotiropoulos.

He was one of the most distinguished contemporary Greek songwriters and composers of orchestral music, with the classical guitar featuring as the main instrument. His discography is remarkable in volume and distinctions, and his influence on contemporary Greek music is significant.

He was the founder and director of the Greek music magazine TaR. Since 2006, and in collaboration with the guitarist-composer Kostas Grigoreas, he published its digital version, under the name TaR online music magazine.

Mavroudis died from a fall on 3 January 2023, at the age of 77.
