= Agamemnon (opera) =

1967 opera by Felix Werder

Agamemnon is an opera in one act by composer Felix Werder. Werder used his own libretto for the work which is based on Gilbert Murray's English language translation of the Ancient Greek tragedy Oresteia by Aeschylus. The work was composed in 1967 with the title The Agamemnon of Aeschylus, and was first performed under that name in that year on ABC radio. Afterwards Werder reworked some of the music and retitled the piece Agamemnon for the opera's first staged performance at the Grant Street Theatre in Melbourne on 1 June 1977 in a production led by conductor Hiroyuki Iwaki. The opera uses Twelve-tone technique in its composition and is structured in 25 sections.

== Roles ==
- King Agamemnon (bass)
- Aegisthus (countertenor)
- Clytemnestra (soprano)
- Cassandra (soprano)
