= Norbert von Hannenheim =

German composer

Norbert Wolfgang Stephan Hann von Hannenheim (15 May 1898, Nagyszeben – 29 September 1945 in the Landeskrankenhaus Obrawalde near Międzyrzecz) was an Austro-Hungarian-born German composer. He is seen as one of the most brilliant later pupils of Arnold Schoenberg.

== Life ==
A member of the Saxon community in Transylvania, Hannenheim was born in the city of Nagyszeben (in German: Hermannstadt, present-day Sibiu). He visited the German High School in Hermannstadt and received private piano lessons. Hannenheim occupied himself with music since his childhood and occasionally wrote compositions as an autodidact. In 1916 he was scheduled to perform a movement of his piano sonata, but recruitment into the army prevented this. From his early times date some tonalic settings of poems, which he partly published himself. He studied in Graz, Austria, from 1922 to 1923, and subsequently with Paul Graener in Leipzig. Here he composed pieces of chamber music for different ensembles, pieces for orchestra, one concerto for violin with chamber orchestra, one concerto for violoncello with chamber orchestra, one symphony for big orchestra in one movement and a concerto for big orchestra. In 1925, in the competition for the "George Enescu-Preis", Hannenheim won the "Zweiten Nationalpreis für Komposition" ("Second national prize for composition"). The piece, which was performed, was the first of six sonatas for violin, composed in this year. It remained characteristic of Hannenheim, that he liked to write several pieces for the same instrument or ensemble nearly simultaneously. In 1928/29 he continued his composition studies with Alexander Jemnitz in Budapest. Hannenheim was then a pupil in Schoenberg's Master Class in Composition at the Prussian Academy of Arts in Berlin (1929 to 1932), along with Alfred Keller, Peter Schacht, Nikos Skalkottas and Natalia Pravosudovich. Schoenberg regarded him highly, calling him "one of the most interesting personalities I have ever met". Perhaps Schoenberg was particularly impressed by Hannenheim, because "he was nearly the only one, who would contradict him" (Erich Schmid).

Hannenheim was a prolific composer and espoused the twelve-note technique even as a student. His works were performed at concerts in the Akademie der Künste (for example, he conducted the premiere of a Symphony in a concert devoted to Schoenberg's pupils on 20 May 1930 — it shared the programme with works by his fellow-students Winfried Zillig and Nikos Skalkottas). He composed many pieces at this time, but had big problems, earning enough money to live on. In 1932 he won the "Mendelssohn Staatspreis". In the same year he had a nervous breakdown, from which he soon recovered. His "2. piano concerto with small orchestra" in one movement was very successful and was broadcast by many radio stations all over the world. Together with other colleagues, he won the "Emil Hertzka-Preis" in 1933. The "Dritte Reich" ended his career. He had only few concerts. But works of his were performed as a “Roumanian” composer, at pre-World War II ISCM Festivals (as a Romanian composer, since the ISCM was formally proscribed by the Nazi German musical authorities). Now he turned to arrangements of folk music. From the beginning of the Second World War, we know very little about Hannenheim.

It was long believed that Hannenheim perished in an Allied air raid on Berlin and that all his scores were destroyed, but numerous songs, piano sonatas and string quartets have come to light in recent years. And it now appears that Hannenheim, who had intermittent but acute psychological problems, was admitted into a German psychiatric hospital in Berlin in 1944 and then into the Euthanasia hospital Obrawalde near Międzyrzecz (today Poland). He survived the Nazi regime, but died some four months after the war ended, from heart disease (according to the death certificate).

== Work ==
Hannenheim did register about 80 pieces for voice and piano at the "Genossenschaft Deutscher Tonsetzer". He used poems of artists like Rainer Maria Rilke, Friedrich Hölderlin, Max Dauthendey, Otto Erich Hartleben, Hermann Hesse, Friedrich Nietzsche, Christian Morgenstern, Rudolf G. Binding, Arno Holz. Only 45 out of more than 230 pieces, are known today. The others were destroyed in the chaos of the war's end, are forgotten or were burned under delusion by Hannenheim himself.
