= Antigoni Goni =

Antigoni Goni (born 8 March 1969) is a Greek guitarist, recording artist, and performer, who was the founder and Chair of the Pre-College Division of the Guitar Department at the Juilliard School

Goni was born in Athens, Greece, and studied with Evangelos Assimakopoulos at the National Conservatory of Athens, with John Mills at the Royal Academy of Music in London and extensively in master classes with Julian Bream. She continued her studies with Sharon Isbin at the Juilliard School in New York.

She has performed throughout the United States, Japan, Portugal, France, and other countries. Her career blossomed in the mid-1990s after winning the Guitar Foundation of America competition, which resulted in some 65 concerts in North America and a contract with Naxos Records for which she has recorded three highly successful CDs. Goni released an additional solo album, Hymn to the Muse, under Timespan Recordings in 2016.

Goni is a professor at the Royal Conservatory in Brussels, and artist-in-residence for San Francisco Performances. She was Chairman of the Guitar Department at Juilliard Pre-College Division between 1995 and 2004, and she currently holds positions at Columbia University and the Royal Academy of Music in London, splitting her time between both coasts of the United States, Brussels and Athens.

In 2007 Goni founded The Volterra Project, a holistic guitar workshop held in Volterra, Italy each summer.

== Discography ==
- Guitar Recital: Antigoni Goni (Naxos, 1997)
- Barrios Mangore, A.: Guitar Music, Vol. 1 (Naxos, 2001)
- DUARTE: Guitar Music (2001)
- RODRIGO: Joaquin Rodrigo - A Portrait (Naxos Educational, 2008) compilation album
- Hymn to the Muse (Timespan Recordings, 2016)
