= Hans Erich Apostel =

German-born Austrian composer (1901–1972)

- Born: 22 January 1901; Karlsruhe, Germany
- Died: 30 November 1972 (aged 71); Vienna, Austria
- Occupations: Classical composer; Music editor
- Organizations: Gesellschaft für Neue Musik; Universal Edition
- Awards: Grand Austrian State Prize

Hans Erich Apostel (22 January 1901 – 30 November 1972) was a German-born Austrian composer of classical music.

== Life and career ==
Hans Erich Apostel was born on 22 January 1901 in Karlsruhe, Germany. He studied at the Munz Conservatory in his native city from 1915 to 1919. There he was a pupil Alfred Lorenz who taught him piano, music theory, and conducting.

In 1920 he was Kapellmeister and répétiteur at the Badisches Landestheater in Karlsruhe. He studied in Vienna with Arnold Schoenberg from 1921 to 1925, and from 1925 to 1935 with Alban Berg, two prominent members of the Second Viennese School. At the same time, he taught piano, composition and music theory privately.

Some of his compositions demonstrate his particular affinity with expressionist painting—he was friends with Emil Nolde, Oskar Kokoschka and Alfred Kubin. During the Nazi period his music was proscribed as degenerate art, but he continued to live in Vienna until his death in 1972.

Apostel was active as a pianist, accompanist, and conductor of contemporary music in Austria, Germany, Switzerland and Italy. After the war, he was prominent in the Austrian branch of the Gesellschaft für Neue Musik, of which he was president from 1947 to 1950.

He was an editor for the Universal Edition, and was responsible for new editions of the operas of Alban Berg, Wozzeck (published in 1955) and Lulu (published in 1963).

Although he won numerous prizes for his compositions (including the Grand Austrian State Prize in 1957), his works have rarely been performed. He is buried in the Zentralfriedhof in Vienna, Group 32 C, No. 57.
