= Nikos Skalkottas =

Greek composer

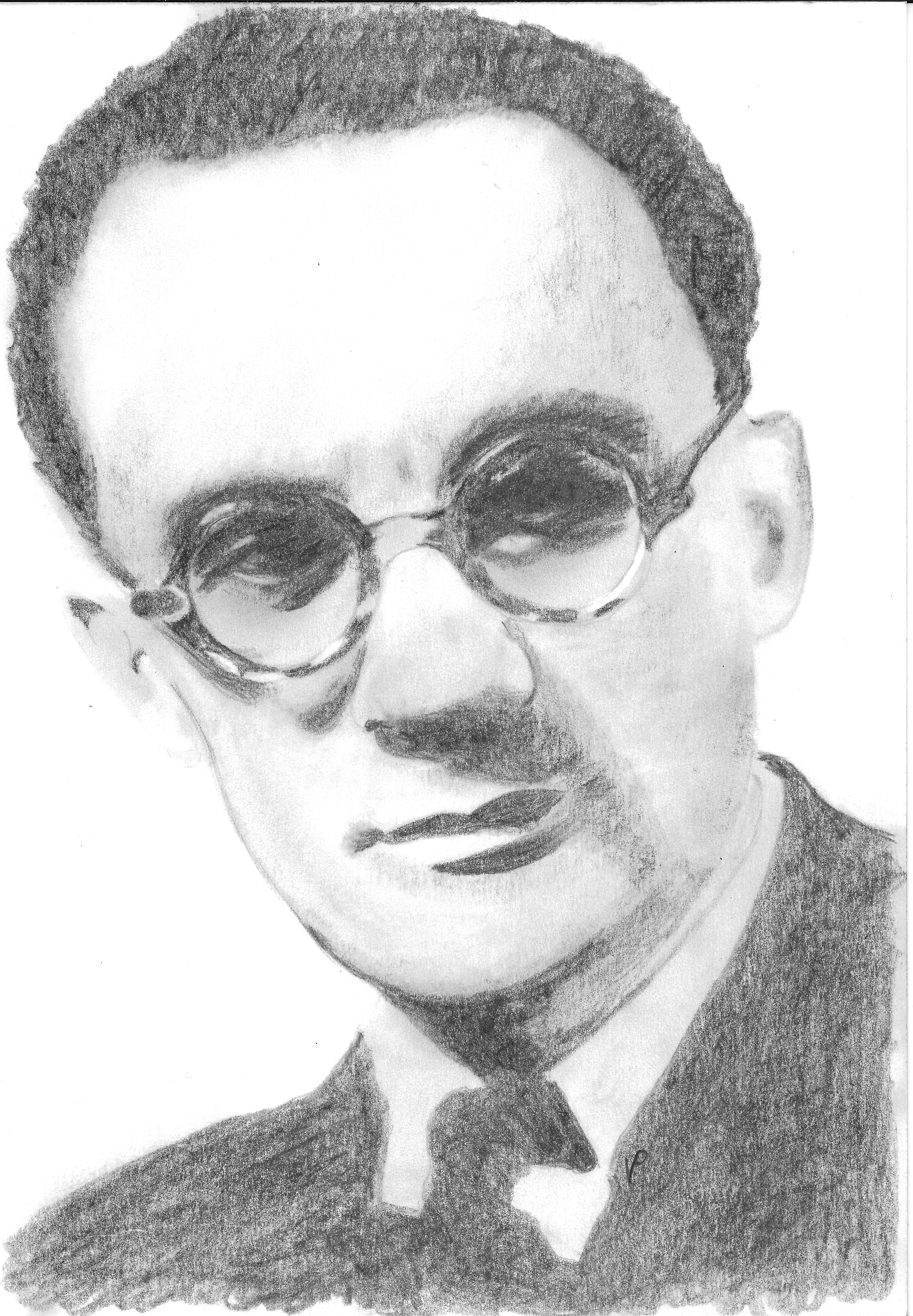
Nikos Skalkottas. Sketch by Véronique Fournier-Pouyet

Nikos Skalkottas (Greek: Νίκος Σκαλκώτας; 21 March 1904 – 19 September 1949) was a Greek composer of 20th-century classical music. A member of the Second Viennese School, he drew his influences from both the classical repertoire and the Greek tradition. He also produced a sizeable amount of tonal music in the last phase of his musical creativity.

== Biography ==
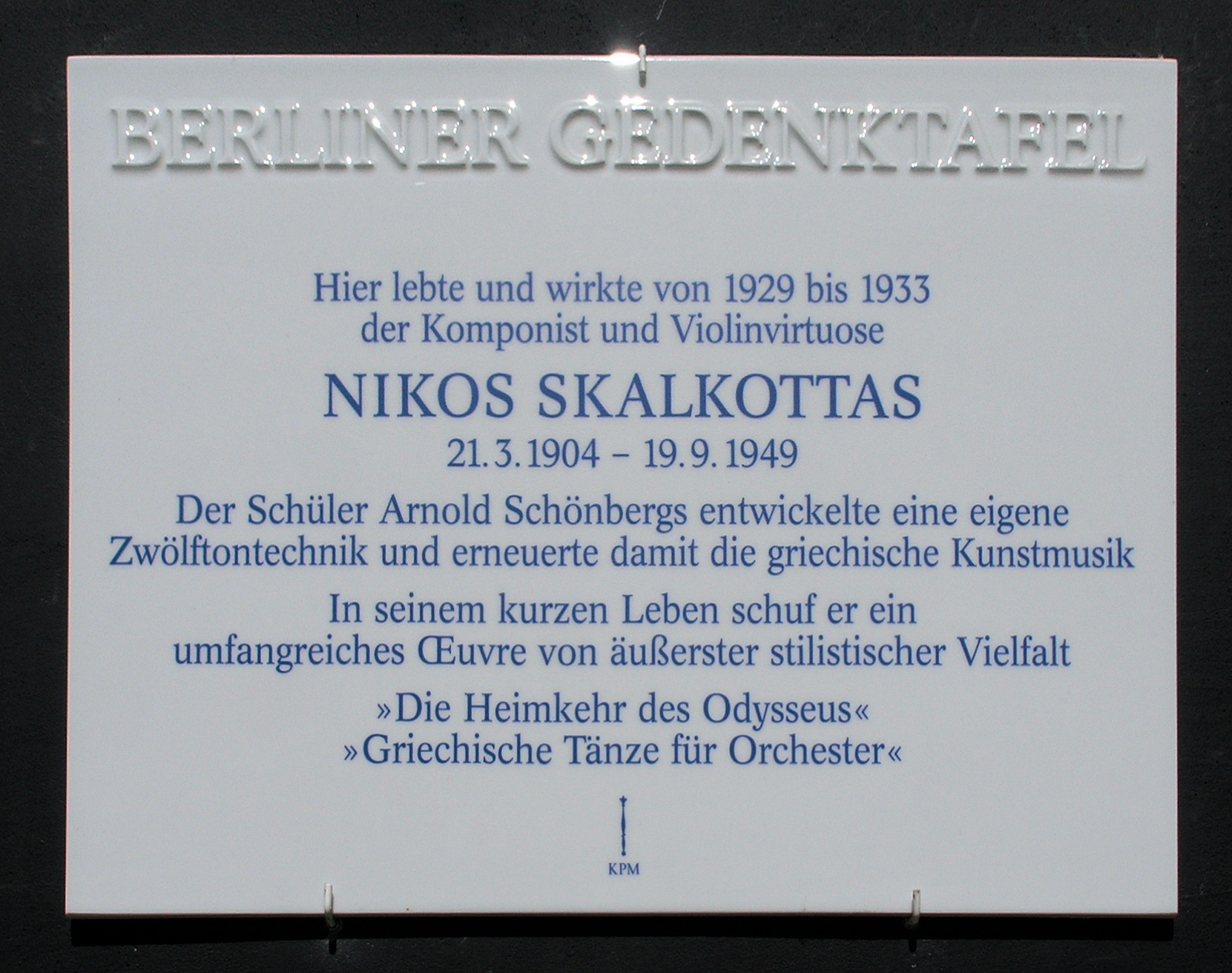
Commemorative plate in Berlin

Skalkottas was born in Chalcis on the island of Euboea. He started violin lessons with his father and uncle Kostas Skalkottas at the age of five, three years after his family moved to Athens because Kostas had lost the post of town bandmaster in 1906 due to political and legal intrigues (Thornley 2001). He continued studying violin with Tony Schultze at the Athens Conservatory, from which he graduated in 1920 with a diploma of high distinction. The following year a scholarship from the Averoff Foundation enabled him to study abroad. From 1921 to 1933 he lived in Berlin, where he first took violin lessons at the Prussian Academy of Arts with Willy Hess (Thornley 2001). Deciding in 1923 to give up his career as a violinist and become a composer, he studied composition with Robert Kahn, Paul Juon, Kurt Weill and Philipp Jarnach. Between 1927 and 1932 he was a member of Arnold Schoenberg's Masterclass in Composition at the Academy of Arts (Thornley 2001), where his fellow pupils included Marc Blitzstein, Roberto Gerhard, Norbert von Hannenheim, Natalia Pravosudovich and Peter Schacht. Skalkottas had been living for several years with the Russian-Jewish violinist Matla Temko (Thornley 2001); they had two children, though only the second, a daughter, survived infancy, and the end of their relationship increased his already-present feelings of self-doubt and insecurity (Thornley 2001). In 1930 Skalkottas devoted considerable effort to having some of his works performed in Athens, but they were met with incomprehension, and even in Berlin his few performances did not make much better headway. In 1931 he seems to have had a personal and artistic crisis: his relationship with Temko came to an end and he is also reported to have fallen out with Schoenberg, though the nature of their disagreement is unclear and Schoenberg continued to rate him highly as a composer. In any event Skalkottas seems to have composed nothing for at least two years.

In March 1933 he was forced by poverty and debt to return to Athens, intending to stay a few months and then return to Berlin. However, he suffered a nervous breakdown and his passport was confiscated by the Greek authorities (Thornley 2001) (apparently because he had never done military service) and in fact remained in Greece for the rest of his life. Among the various possessions he left behind were a large number of manuscripts; many of these were then lost or destroyed (although some were found in a secondhand bookshop in 1954). According to another account, his manuscripts were sold by his German landlady shortly after he left Berlin (Thornley 2001). In Athens Skalkottas sought other means of funding through scholarships or paid work as an orchestral player, but he was quickly disillusioned with the state of musical affairs in Athens at the time. Until his death he earned a living as a back-desk violinist in the Athens Conservatory, Radio and Opera orchestras. In the mid-1930s he worked at the Folk Music Archive in Athens, and did transcriptions of Greek folk songs into Western-music scores for the musicologist Melpo Merlier.

As a composer he worked alone, but wrote prolifically, mainly in his very personal post-Schoenbergian idiom that had little chance of being comprehended by the Greek musical establishment. He did secure some performances, especially of some of the Greek Dances and a few of his more tonal works, but the vast bulk of his music went unheard. During the German occupation of Greece he was placed in an internment camp for some months. In 1946 he married the pianist Maria Pangali; they had two sons. In 1949, at the age of 45 and shortly before the birth of his second son, he died in Athens of what appears to have been the rupture of a neglected common hernia, leaving some symphonic works with incomplete orchestration, and many completed works that were given posthumous premieres.

== Music ==
Skalkottas's early works, most of which he wrote in Berlin, are lost, as are some of those written in Athens. The earliest of his works available to us today date from 1922–24; these are piano compositions as well as the orchestration of Cretan Feast by Dimitri Mitropoulos. Among the works written in Berlin are the sonata for solo violin, several works for piano, chamber music and some symphonic works. Although during the period 1931–34 Skalkottas did not compose anything, he resumed composing in Athens and continued until his death. His output comprised symphonic works (36 Greek Dances, the symphonic overture The Return of Ulysses, the fairy drama Mayday Spell, the Second Symphonic Suite, the ballet The Maiden and Death, works for wind orchestra and several concertos), chamber, vocal and instrumental works including the huge cycle of 32 Piano Pieces.

Besides his musical work, Skalkottas compiled an important theoretical work, consisting of several "musical articles", a Treatise on Orchestration, musical analyses, etc. Skalkottas soon shaped his personal features of musical writing so that any influence of his teachers was soon assimilated creatively in a manner of composition that is absolutely personal and recognizable.

Throughout his career Skalkottas remained faithful to the neo-classical ideals of Neue Sachlichkeit and 'absolute music' proclaimed in Europe in 1925. Already in Berlin he was taking an interest in jazz and at the same time developing a very personal form of the twelve-note method, making use of not one but several tone-rows in a work and organizing these rows to define different thematic and harmonic areas. (For example, the Largo Sinfonico employs no fewer than 16 twelve-tone rows.) Like Schoenberg, he persistently cultivated classical forms (such as sonata, variations, suite), but his opus is divided between atonal, twelve-tone and tonal works, all three categories spanning his entire composing career. Such apparent variety could have been intensified by a love of Greek folk music. The most striking example of his commitment to Greek folk music is the series of 36 Greek Dances composed for orchestra between 1931 and 1936, arranged for various different ensembles in the ensuing years and in part radically re-orchestrated in 1948–49. About two-thirds of these dances are based on genuine Greek folk themes from different parts of the Greek mainland and islands, but the other third use material of Skalkottas's own composition in folk style.

The other outstanding tonal work from this period is his ballet suite The Maiden and Death (1938). It is based on a well known Greek folk-poem in which the dead love interest of young Konstantis weighs heavily on his mind. Like Orpheus, he is determined to fight destiny and unite with her. She remains in the land of the dead until Konstantis arrives at the end of the work and takes her back to the world of the living. According to the Gramophone Musical Guide (2010), which reviewed a recording with the Iceland Symphony Orchestra under the baton of Nikos Christodoulou, "Here Skalkottas's brilliant orchestration shines through in what's much more than a pre-run of The Mayday Spell. The idiom is less fragmentary than the latter; indeed, it suggests a Greek Miraculous Mandarin, if less overtly spectacular in sound or scandalous in plot." Even more enthusiastically, music critic David Hurwitz reviewed it with the phrase "The piece is drop-dead gorgeous, and will thrill fans of late-Romantic Nationalist music." It too was later orchestrated for a full symphonic orchestra (1948).

Nevertheless, he remained skeptical of the attempts of his Greek contemporaries to integrate folk music into the modern symphonic style, and only juxtaposed and mixed folk, atonal and 12-note styles in a few works such as the incidental music to Christos Evelpides's 1943 fairy-tale drama Mayday Spell. Skalkottas was evidently reluctant to deploy the kind of structural and stylistic tensions that would have betrayed the integrationist ideals of his Schoenbergian inheritance. This could be seen (in terms of a comprehensive connecting impulse) as a link between the Second Viennese, Busoni, Stravinsky and Bartókian schools. Around 1945 he seems to have reappraised his aesthetic direction to some extent and written several works in a more conventionally tonal idiom—many of these have key signatures, for instance, yet the general level of dissonance is not significantly lessened. His most impressive tonal works in this last period of creativity are his Classical Symphony in A (1947), the astonishingly atmospheric The Sea (1948-1949), a ballet suite, which even includes a musical reference to the legendary sister of Alexander the Great, who roams the sea as a mermaid; a Sinfonietta in B Flat Major (1948); and the programmatic Four Images (1948-1949), which comes from the dance suite The Land and the Sea of Greece (1948) for solo piano.

== Posthumous reputation ==
It was only after his death that Skalkottas' music began to be played, published or critically estimated to a great extent, partly due to the efforts of friends and disciples such as John G. Papaioannou and George Hadjinikos.

In 1988 a short documentary (60 mins) about his life and work was filmed with funding from the local authorities of Skalkottas' birthplace (the isle of Euboea) as well as the Greek Ministry of Culture.

Between the years 1998 and 2008, the Swedish record label BIS records released recordings of his works.
