= Dimitri Fampas =

Greek classical guitarist and composer

- Born: Dimitri Fampas; 22 December 1921; Milina of Lafkos, Greece
- Died: 3 May 1996 (aged 74)
- Genre: Classical
- Occupations: Performer, composer, professor
- Instrument: Guitar
- Years active: 1960–1996
- Label: Universal Music AE

Dimitris Fampas (Δημήτρης Φάμπας, Dimitris Fabas) (22 December 1921 – 3 May 1996) was a Greek classical guitarist and composer.

== Life and career ==
Fampas was born in Milina, a small village on Mount Pelion near Volos, Greece. As a child, he played traditional music on lute and mandolin. In 1939, he pursued musical studies in Athens. He studied Advanced Musical Theory with Theodore Vavayiannis and counterpoint with Costa Kydoniatis at the Athens Conservatory. He studied with Nicholas Ioannou, and by 1953, he received a diploma in classical guitar performance cum laude from the National Conservatory of Greece. In 1955 and 1956, he received a scholarship from the Italian government to study guitar with Andrés Segovia and Emilio Pujol at the Academia Chigianna in Siena. In 1959, he attended classes with Segovia once more, this time at the Academy of Santiago de Compostela, Spain, receiving a scholarship from Segovia himself.

Fampas' career spanned almost four decades and hundreds of recitals worldwide. He toured in England, Germany, France, Spain, Italy, Portugal, Austria, Czechoslovakia, Hungary, Yugoslavia, Turkey, US, Canada, USSR and the Vatican. He appeared in most major cities of Greece as well as in the Ancient Theater of Epidaurus. He recorded guitar concertos such as the L. Boccherini-G. Cassado concerto, and he played the world premier recording of the Concerto para tres Hermanas by Carlo Pizzini with the National Radio Symphony Orchestra of Greece. He often performed live TV recitals in Greece, Spain, and US.

Dimitri Fampas taught at the National Conservatory of Athens. Thousands of guitarists have been taught by Fampas and his disciples in the course of fifty years. Some 38 prizes in international guitar competitions have been won by Fampas' pupils. Among his most noted pupils are Evangelos Assimakopoulos and Liza Zoe, Eleftheria Kotzia, Kyriakos Tzortzinakis, Eva Fampas, Notis Mavroudis, Yiannis Manolidakis, Evangelos Boudounis, Spiros Diamantis and Kostas Grigoreas.

Dimitri Fampas created two guitar orchestras, one for young players and another for advanced guitarists, with which he made numerous concert appearances and tours in Greece during 1979–1989. He was a member of the jury in international guitar competitions and he offered master-classes and lectures in numerous seminars and festivals. He lectured on the history of the classical guitar over the Greek National Radio and TV, the BBC, and on several stations in Hungary, in Czechoslovakia, in the US and elsewhere.

He has served as president of the Union of Conservatory Professors of Greece, as a member of the Greek Composers' Union, as a member of the Greek National Board of Music/IMC and UNESCO.

His life and artistic contribution are mentioned in the National and International Who's Who, in the Cambridge dictionary of biographies of famous men and scholars as well as in the Guitar dictionaries and music history books of Japan, England, Poland, GDR, Italy and Greece, the Encyclopedias of Papyrus Larouse, and Harris Patsis.

== Music ==
Fampas composed over two hundred solos, studies and dances, enriching the guitar literature. Fampas' compositions proved popular, and they became standard guitar repertory. His guitar music, often romantic and lyrical, richly dominated by Greek traditional elements, colors and rhythms, expresses his love for the guitar and for his country, as well as his passionate personality.

His work has been published by the publishing houses of Ricordi (Milan and São Paulo), Max Eschig (Paris), Columbia (U.S.), Lathkil (Bakewell, Derbyshire, UK), Mel Bay (Pacific, Missouri), Ph. Nakas and Papagrigoriou-Nakas (Athens), and M. Nikolaidis / Orpheus Editions (Athens).

Dimitri Fampas also recorded theatre and film music by Greek composers such as Mikis Theodorakis, Manos Hatzidakis, Argiris Kounadis and Stavros Xarhakos. Through the 1960s and early '70s Fampas collaborated as a soloist to many theatrical and film music productions, being the first Greek classical guitarist to perform on stage and to record theatrical music soundtracks.

== Legacy ==
Fampas' early life was depicted in The Tales of Faith by Denis Ronda. For his artistic contribution to music and to society, he was honoured with numerous awards and medals by cultural associations, music clubs and municipalities. Audiovisual material on Dimitri Fampas has been presented and broadcast by national Greek TV, including a 45-minute interview with G. Sgourakis for the series Monograma which focused on outstanding Greek artists and scientists.

The Guitar Friends Association Dimitri Fampas (member of the Greek National Music Council, and the IMC of UNESCO), is a non-profit cultural society founded in 1999 under the initiative of the guitarist-professor Eva Fampas dedicated to serving Dimitri Fampas' legacy and music, encouraging new talented artists and promotion of Greek guitar music.

On 11 January 2006, Dimitri Fampas' archives, including original music, editions, lectures, concert programmes and newspapers as well as a collection of unpublished recordings and photos concerning his life and career, were donated to the Benaki Museum of Athens.

== Compositions ==
=== Guitar solo ===
- "Triplet Memory To Emilio Pujol"
- "Reverie"
- "Valsa de Brasilia to Ronoel Simoes" (1st Version)
- "Vals" (revised)
- "Danse Syrtos"
- "Danse Ballos"
- "A Heart-Felt Conversation", to Andrés Segovia for his 90th birthday
- "Suite No. 3, sur une forme ancienne"
- "Prelude-Bourrée-Allemande-Aria Mélancolique-Loure 1 & 2"
- "Jeux d'enfants" (Kavatina No 1)
- "Conte" (Kavatina No. 1)
- "Poeme" (Kavatina No. 10) to Notis Mavroudis
- "Danse imaginaire" (Kavatina No 1) to Liza Zoi
- "Karagouna", Greek dance
- "Vlacha", Greek dance
- Greek Dance "Sousta" (2 versions)
- "Vision"
- "The Country of Centaurs" (Greek Suite)
- "Tsamikos Dance" (Greek Suite)
- "Ravines" (Greek Suite)
- "Syrtaki Dance" (Greek Suite)
- "Boléro"
- "March of Spain"
- "Suite No. 2 for a Beloved Family" (to Jeni, to Eva, to Evangelos)
- "Admiration" (Kavatina No. 2)
- "Little Waltz" (Kavatina No. 2)
- "Sensations" (Kavatina No. 2)
- 24 Concert Studies (1–12 to Ida Presti / 13–24 to Andrés Segovia)
- 23 Melodies for Children and Young Guitarists ("A Dream", "Guahira Danse", "Tsamikos Dance", "For Eva", "Milina", "Varcarola", "Prelude", "Petit Vals", are included)
- "Romantza"
- "Greek Song"
- "Evgenoula", Theme with Variations
- 9 Sentimental Preludes
- Sentimental Suite (6 songs dedicated to his fiancée)
- Melodies for Young Guitarists, 2nd Collection ("Minuet", "Tender Moments", "The Girl in Green", "The Phone-Call", "Song without Words No. 1 & 2", "A Waltz for a Great Woman", others)
- "A Lafkos' Faire"
- "Segovia's Portrait"
- "The Windsong"

=== Guitar duo ===
- "Fantasy"
- "Greek Dance of Corfou"
- "Greek Song of Thessaly"
- "Danse Ballos"
- "Petit Vals"

=== Guitar ensemble ===
- "Greek Fiesta for 3 Guitars" (A Fair of Pilion)
- "Tzeni Variations for 3 Guitars" (Suite for a Beloved Family)
- "The Layiarni" (Variations on the Traditional Greek Song) for Voice and Guitar Orchestra
- "Ode to Peace for Voice and 3 Guitars", based on the poem 'Peace' by J. Ritsos
- "Songs for Voice and Guitar", lyrics by L. Raftopoulos & B. Spilios
