= History of the Jews in Innsbruck =

Innsbruck Jews
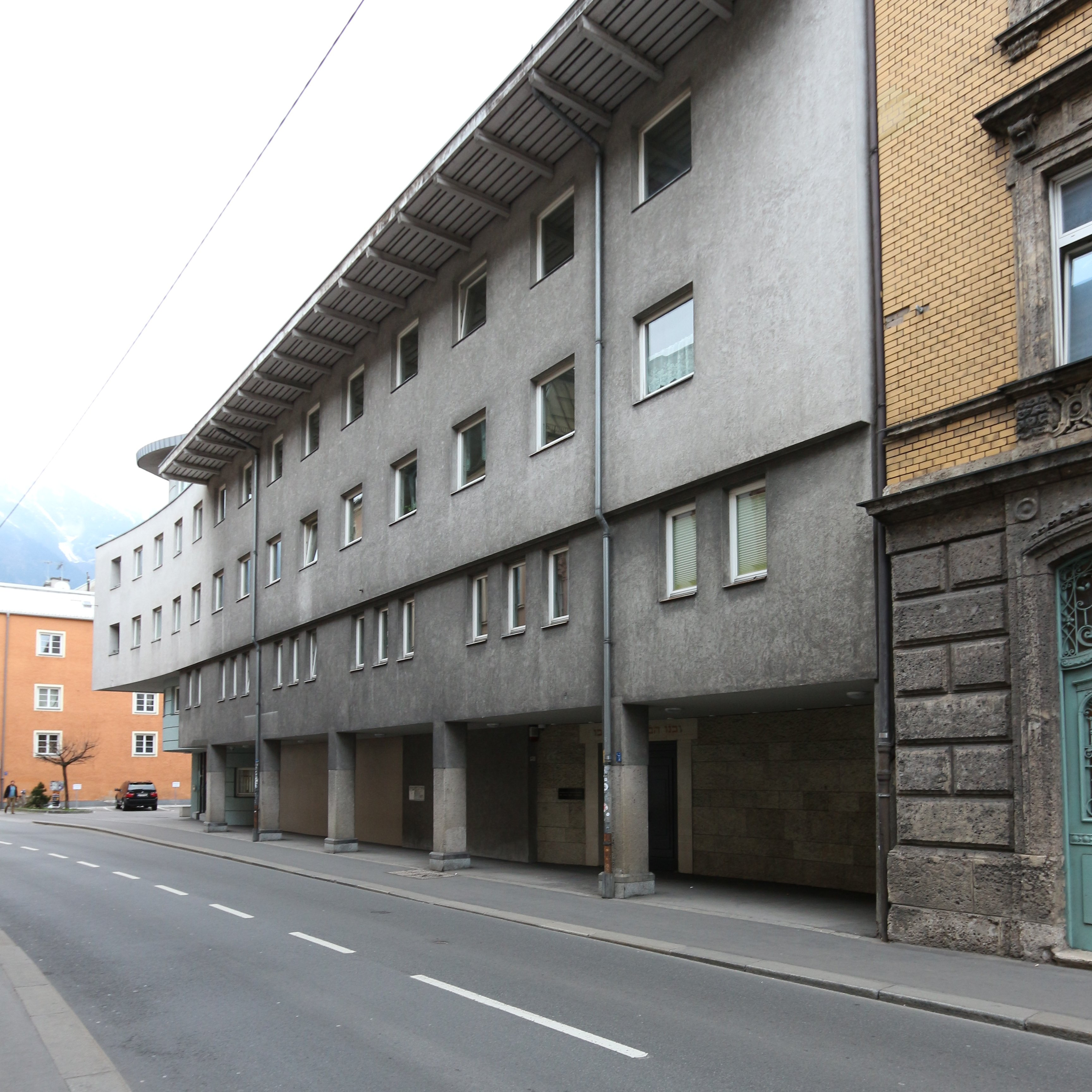
- Synagogue Innsbruck 01; Synagogue in Innsbruck

Total population
- 120 (2022)

Languages
- Austrian German, Yiddish, Hebrew

Religion
- Judaism

Related ethnic groups
- Other Jews (Ashkenazi, Sephardic, Mizrahi), German Jews, Czech Jews, Polish Jews, Hungarian Jews, Russian Jews, Ukrainian Jews

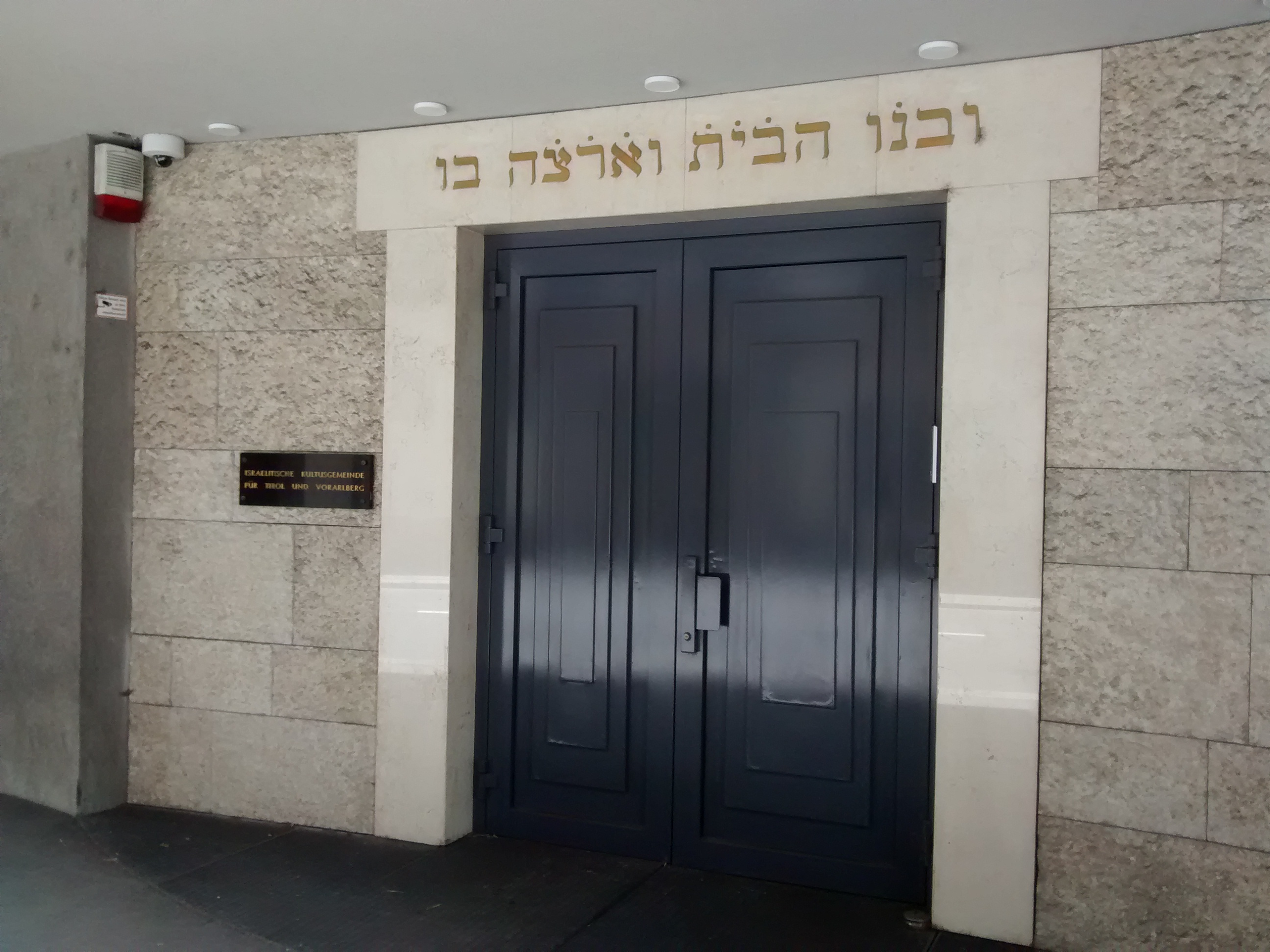
Israelitische Kultusgemeinde für Tirol und Vorarlberg

The history of the Jews in Innsbruck dates back to the 13th century, where the Jewish community of Innsbruck was relatively small with many expulsions occurring over the centuries.

During the 17th century, the existence of the Innsbruck Jews was insecure, facing many expulsions. The 19th century saw Jews settled in Innsbruck with a synagogue, religious life and Jewish-Christian coexistence.

The highest number of Jews in Innsbruck was before World War I, with approximately 500 people. During the Nazi era, the Jews of Innsbruck faced persecution and destruction. At the beginning of the Holocaust, in 1938, there were approximately 250 Jews remaining, as many had fled the country. Many Jews from Innsbruck were murdered during the Holocaust, where Innsbruck Jews were particularly targeted during Kristallnacht.

After WWII, the Jewish community of Innsbruck grew slowly, with predominantly older members returning. The old synagogue which was destroyed during the pogrom was rebuilt in the same location and many memorials were placed to honour victims of the Holocaust.

== 13–19th centuries ==
After a Jew was mentioned as mint master to the duke of Tyrol in the 13th century, Jewish traders and moneylenders moved to Innsbruck from Italy and Carinthia. Many Jews left Innsbruck during the 14th century, but once Florentine bankers became bankrupt, Jews returned to replace these bankers. The Jewish community suffered during the Black Death persecution, but the community remained. During the 16th century, Jews became established in Innsbruck as bankers and agents of foreign trading houses. Jews in Innsbruck were not affected by the imperial elicit expelling of Jews from Tyrol in 1520.

Duke Ferdinand II led Tyrol in 1618–1623. During his reign, many Jews settled in Innsbruck, earning positions in government and esteemed court positions. Following Duke Ferdinand II's death, no Jews were allowed in Innsbruck and religious services were held in private residences. In 1674, Burghers expelled the Jews from Innsbruck and only two families remained. Two years later, in 1676, Jews expelled from Hohenems were allowed to settle in Innsbruck.

The beginning of the 18th century saw many Jewish people returning to Innsbruck. In 1714, Jews were again expelled by the government as they endangered "the Christian character of the city". Only two brothers were allowed to remain due to generous donations they had made to the city hospital. Maria Theresa declared Innsbruck a "Jew-free city" in 1748 and only eight tolerated Jews remained in Tyrol. In 1785, four or five Jewish families were recorded in Tyrol. The Tyrolean Rebellion of 1809 started anti-Jewish acts, where no more Jews were allowed to settle in Tyrol. In the 1840s, Jews from Hohenems established factories in Innsbruck and Jews were granted equal rights after the Constitution in Austria in 1867, causing Jews from all over Austria to resettle in Innsbruck.

In 1869, a population of 27 Jews were recorded in Innsbruck (0.4% of the total population). Orthodox Jews did not reside in Innsbruck due to reform synagogues and obstacles placed on the Jews. In 1890, the Jews of Innsbruck belonged to a community and the Rabbinate of Hohenems.

== World War I ==
In 1914, Rabbi Josef Link moved from Hohenems to Innsbruck where there was already a small community. He served as the first rabbi for the Jewish community of Innsbruck until 1932. On the eve of World War I, there was a population of nearly 500 Jews in Innsbruck.

WWI brought national socialists to Innsbruck, which brought anti-Semitism. In the 1930s, the young Innsbruck Jewish community gained strong Zionist views.

During the interwar period, the Innsbruck Jews tried to raise funds to build a synagogue in Silgasse 15, but failed due to the economic depression.

== World War II and the Holocaust ==
At the beginning of 1938, there was approximately 250-280 Jewish people in the Tyrol and Vorarlberg area. Dr Elimelech Rimalt was the Rabbi of Innsbruck until 1938, during the Nazi Party rise of power. Jewish people in Innsbruck faced exclusion from schools, business licences were withdrawn, rent contracts cancelled and stores and businesses were "aryanised" by the Nazis. Jews in Innsbruck prepared for emigration when the community was ordered to disband, and the rabbinate was dissolved. It is estimated that half of the Jewish community in Innsbruck were able to leave, many emigrating to Mandatory Palestine and thus escaping persecution.

The Jewish community of Innsbruck faced violence led by the Nazis during the pogrom on November 9–10, 1938. This event is known as Kristallnacht (The Night of Broken Glass). Only older community members and some children remained in Innsbruck during the pogrom, as many young adults had already fled. During the night, Jewish owned homes were raided and destroyed, the synagogue and cemetery were desecrated, 18 members were attacked or arrested, and four leaders of the Innsbruck community were murdered. Although there were a small number of Jewish people in Innsbruck, they faced more violence than other communities.

Many Jewish people left Innsbruck after Kristallnacht. By mid 1939, nearly all Jews were forced to leave the Tyrol and Vorarlberg district.

At least 200 Jews from Innsbruck were murdered during the Holocaust. Many survived abroad and in concentration camps, however, many Jews’ fates remain unknown.

=== Pogrom ===
On 9–10 November 1938, the pogrom was led and perpetrated by the SA and SS. Prior to the pogrom, SS Security Service (Sicherheitsdient, SD) noted Jewish people in Innsbruck not leaving the country. In September 1938, Adolf Eichmann ordered the Jews of Innsbruck to emigrate quickly, and they were given a time limit to leave Tyrol based on wealth and status. The pogrom was centred in Innsbruck, the capital of the Tyrol-Vorarlberg region.

Perpetrators were instructed to kill four prominent citizens and destroy the synagogue to send a message to Jews that they were no longer wanted in Innsbruck. 18 Jewish people in Innsbruck were arrested by the SD as they were "persons fit for work".

The pogrom began at 3.30am on the tenth of November, where all homes and businesses owned by Jews were destroyed. The synagogue was forced open, destroyed and the furnishings were demolished. Four notable members of the community were murdered, and many attacked and maltreated.

The Pogrom caused Jews in Innsbruck to leave. 26 Jews left within the month, most moving to Vienna.

=== Notable attacks and murders ===
During the night of the pogrom, the Jews of Innsbruck faced violence. The SD noted after that "If some Jews suffered no damage in this operation, then it is probably because they were overlooked".

==== Richard Berger ====
The chairman of the Jewish Community, Richard Berger had previously been asked by the Gestapo to postpone his intended departure from Innsbruck as his role was needed in the Jewish Community of Innsbruck. Berger was apprehended at his home and taken outside the city near the riverbank. He was forced out of the car and beaten in the head with pistols and fists and then stoned to death. His body was thrown into the River Inn and one of the SS men shot Berger in the head as he was floating.

==== Dr. Wilhelm Bauer ====
Dr. Wilhelm Bauer was the Head of the Jewish trade organisation in Innsbruck. Perpetrators broke into his apartment and ordered Bauer to get dressed and go with them. Bauer was attacked at the front of his building, being hit in the head by multiple pistols and stabbed until he collapsed. Wounded badly, Bauer made his way back up to his apartment where his wife was unable to call for help as the telephone cable had been broken. Bauer died in an ambulance on his way to the hospital.

==== Richard Graubart ====
Engineer, Richard Graubart was stabbed in the back with an SS dagger and collapsed. A doctor was called but Graubart died before the doctor arrived. The offenders locked his wife and daughter in the room next door. His family, including his son the musician Michael Graubart, later escaped to England.

==== Josef Adler and his wife ====
Josef Adler was an engineer and active member of "Innsbruck Zionists". Nazi perpetrators forced their way into the Adler's apartment during the night of the pogrom. The couple was beaten on their bed until Josef fell off the bed paralysed on his left side. His wife suffered a concussion. Adler was ordered by his private physician to attend a neurological clinic but died five weeks later. His wife moved to London and returned to Innsbruck after the war in 1950, living in Innsbruck until her death in 1966.

==== Karl Bauer ====
Karl Bauer was a co-owner of department store 'Bauer & Schwarz' and head of 'Reich Federation of Jewish Front-Line Soldiers'. Bauer was assaulted in his apartment, being punched and stabbed in the forehead and lower jaw multiple times and hit with a heavy metal item, leaving him unconscious. Bauer was in hospital for two months and once discharged, emigrated to the United States. Due to his injuries, Bauer was unable to work.

==== Alfred Graubart ====
Engineer Alfred Graubart was physically attacked in his apartment. Graubart was punched and kicked, suffering facial injuries and a concussion. The perpetrators tampered with the telephone cord, so his wife treated Graubart with cold compresses and cognac until he regained consciousness three hours later. Graubart fled to Switzerland at the end of November 1938.

== Post-war era ==
After World War II, only a few older community members returned to Innsbruck. In 1946, one member returned from the concentration camp at Theresienstadt and was appointed the contact person for Jewish matters by the province. The Jewish community in Innsbruck grew slowly and on 14 March 1952, the 'Innsbruck Jewish Community for Tyrol and Vorarlberg' was established. In 1961, the community was run by Oscar von Lubomirski, a converted Polish nobleman. A prayer hall was rented at Zollerstrasse 1, where the Innsbruck Jews would meet and pray. The offices for the 'Innsbruck Jewish Community for Tyrol and Vorarlberg' were housed there.

In 1965, the old synagogue in Silgasse, which was destroyed during the pogrom, was torn down and became a parking spot. Up until the 1980s, the Jews of Innsbruck kept mostly to themselves and in 1981, the Israeli Ambassador to Austria placed a memorial tablet at the location of the old synagogue.

Esther Fritsch was the president of the Jewish Community for Tyrol and Vorarlberg from 1987. A large commemorative event was held in Innsbruck in 1988 for the 50-year anniversary of the pogrom with guest speakers namely Bishop Reinhold Stecher, Chief Rabbi Paul Chaim Eisenberg and Provincial Governor Alois Partl. In 1989, Bishop Reinhold Stecher initiated the Tyrolean Committee for Christian-Jewish Cooperation.

In 1991, the foundation stone was laid for the new synagogue in Innsbruck which was located where the old synagogue originally stood in Silagasse. The synagogue for the Innsbruck Jews opened on 21 March 1993, and an event was held with many honorary guests from all over the world and Israeli Jews who had left Tyrol during WWII. The synagogue has become an important place for tourists, particularly Jewish tourists.

In June 1997, a menorah was consecrated on the Landhausplatz square in the city centre by Chief Rabbi Paul Chaim Eisenberg as a monument to honour victims of the Holocaust. An event was held and holocaust survivors from all over the world were invited. 60 Jews were recorded in Innsbruck in 2001. In November 2008, an Israeli sculptor and painter from Vienna, Dvora Barzilai, created a memorial at the Innsbruck Hospital to commemorate those expelled from the Faculty of Medicine in March 1938.

In 2004 a commemorative stone was laid for Ilse Brüll, a child evacuated from Innsbruck on a Kindertransport who was murdered in Auschwitz.

In December 2014, a library and event space were built in the Jewish Community Centre of Innsbruck which hosts community events, festivals, and meetings. Günter Lieder was elected the new president of the Jewish Community for Tyrol and Vorarlberg in May 2016, taking over from Esther Fritsch, who led the community for 29 years.

In 2019, the community published a book which informed readers about "everything Jewish in and around Innsbruck" and a project outlining all events on the night of the pogrom was published, called "The pogrom of 1938 in Innsbruck – Victims and locations of terror".
