= Peter Schacht =

German composer (1901–1945)

Peter Schacht (1 July 1901 – 25 January 1945) was a German composer.

== Life ==
Born in Bremen, Schacht came from a wealthy Bremen merchant family. In his home town, he attended the humanistic Gymnasium, being particularly interested in mathematical questions. Early on he also received piano, violin and clarinet lessons. Later (1931) he took a course in Baden-Baden taught by violinist Carl Flesch. After the Abitur in 1920, he began to study medicine at the Albert-Ludwigs-Universität Freiburg at the request of his father. In addition, he received composition lessons from the late Romantic Julius Weismann. In Freiburg, he joined the Corps Suevia Freiburg in 1921, which he left again in 1934 in protest against the exclusion of the so-called "Jüdisch versippt". From 1921 to 1926 he went to the University of Music and Theatre Leipzig, where he studied with Hans Grisch (piano) and Fritz Reuter (music theory and composition).

Afterwards, he wanted to enter the master class by Arnold Schoenberg at the Prussian Academy of Arts, which included Alfred Keller, Natalia Pravosudovich, Nikos Skalkottas, and Norbert von Hannenheim. Schacht applied for the class with a neoclassicist String Quintet, which is considered his first surviving composition. After an initial rejection, Schoenberg accepted him into his private circle of students which included . His Variations on a Folk Song for piano (1927) were probably written under Schoenberg. In the winter semester of 1927/28 he officially became Schoenberg's (longest) master student (until 1932). In 1929 he created his piano work Variations on a Theme by Bach. In 1932, his Sonata No. 2 for Violin and Piano (1932) received "distinguished recognition" at the Emil-Hertzka-Preis of Universal Edition in Vienna.

After the Machtergreifung by the Nazis, the Schoenberg circle dissolved. In 1933, his string quartet (1932) was given a scandalous premiere at the Dortmund Tonkünstlerfest. Schacht was not prepared to withdraw the work as demanded. He described it as a "farewell performance in Germany". Until 1936 he lived in seclusion in the inner emigration in Berlin. There he also composed his song cycle Sieben Lieder on poetry by Richard Billinger (around 1933/36).

After 1936, also for financial reasons, he tried to re-establish himself with tonality music to regain a foothold. He withdrew the performance of his Two Pieces for Clarinet and Piano (1931) in 1937 at the World Music Days of the Internationale Gesellschaft für Neue Musik (IGNM). However, he had his Three Pieces for String Orchestra (c. 1936/37) played at an event of the Permanent Council for the International Cooperation of Composers, a National Socialist-dominated counter-organisation to the IGNM, in Winterthur. In 1940, his ballet Andreasnacht was premiered in Essen under Winfried Zillig – although the music, according to Zillig, "looked very blatantly like jazz", the performance was a success. In 1941, he was drafted into the Wehrmacht to guard British prisoner of wars and transferred to Poznań. There, he composed the Kinderstücke for piano and a serenade (lost). Shortly before the end of the war in 1945, he was killed by a Soviet shell during the Battle of Poznań. He was aged 43.

Most of his works are documented in the Archiv Deutsche Musikpflege Bremen. Influenced by Schoenberg, he "composed intelligent, technically skilful, if not very original music of a lyrical basic attitude". In the early 1930s, he created "atonal and serialism-organised music, which, however, is by no means twelve-tone technique".
