= Jorge Morel =

Argentine musician (1931–2021)

Jorge Scibona (9 May 1931 – 10 February 2021), known professionally as Jorge Morel, was a classical guitarist and composer from Argentina.

== Biography ==
Morel was born in Buenos Aires. His father taught him the rudiments of classical guitar from age seven. He went on to study advanced guitar at the internationally renowned academy of Pablo Escobar in Buenos Aires, and after graduating, joined Escobar in radio and concert performances. Jorge Morel died in Orlando, Florida, United States of America.

Morel left Argentina to perform in Ecuador, Colombia and Cuba, where he recorded his first solo LP and was featured in a weekly TV show. Vladimir Bobri, then President of the Classical Guitar Society in New York, lent his recognition and support to Morel after hearing him perform in Puerto Rico. This led to concert engagements in California and Hawaii and Morel's eventual debut at Carnegie Hall in 1961. At this time, he recorded his second LP for Decca Records and subsequently recorded three more albums. Morel appeared at Lincoln Center's Alice Tully Hall in New York, Queen Elizabeth Hall and Wigmore Hall in London, National Concert Hall in Dublin, and Suntory Hall in Tokyo. Over the years he performed in many countries including Argentina, Brazil, Canada, Colombia, Cuba, Ecuador, Puerto Rico, France, Italy, the Netherlands, Norway, Poland, Scotland, Spain, Sweden, Finland, Greece, Singapore, Germany and more.

After moving to New York City, Morel performed nightly at the jazz venue The Village Gate, owned by Art D'Lugoff, who became his manager for a period of three years. During his performances at the Village Gate, he shared the bill with jazz legends such as Erroll Garner, Stan Kenton, Herbie Mann and others. Around this time, Morel met Chet Atkins and established what was to become a lifelong friendship. Chet demonstrated his admiration for Morel in a very tangible way when he helped to arrange for the recording of another album with RCA Victor. Morel was represented by Columbia Artists Management for a total of seven years throughout the 1970s and toured all of North America and Canada performing approximately 70 concerts a year. The last ten years of his life he lived in Orlando.

Morel continued to solidify his reputation as a performing artist and composer with the premiere of Suite del Sur (a concerto for guitar and orchestra), which he performed as soloist with the Los Angeles Philharmonic under the direction of Zubin Mehta. He continued his study of composition for a number of years with teacher, author, conductor and arranger Rudy Schramm.

== Legacy ==
Through his original compositions and arrangements, Jorge Morel has substantially added to the repertoire for classical guitar while consistently challenging traditional, technical, and stylistic limitations. His mastery of the technical combined with intimate knowledge of the physical and acoustical characteristics of the instrument have resulted in an innovative approach to the complex task of composing for the classical guitar. His ability to blend his love for Latin American rhythmic textures and sophisticated jazz harmonies permeates his work with a musical imagination, attested to by the many artists worldwide who have recorded his works.

Names such as John Williams, Chet Atkins, the Assad Brothers, duo Evangelos & Liza, Pepe and Angel Romero, Christopher Parkening, David Russell, David Starobin, Carlos Barbosa-Lima, Ricardo Iznaola, Eliot Fisk, Ricardo Gallén, Vladislav Blaha, Krzysztof Pelech, Hilary Field, and the Hanser McClellan duo, and his best student, Cris Alcamo have performed and recorded many of Morel's compositions and arrangements, including guitar concertos, guitar and string quartets, solos, duets, and guitar quartets as well as fine performance of his Suite del Sur with the Prague Quartet. In addition to the many artists who have recorded his compositions, Morel also created a library of solo recordings on both major and independent labels such as RCA, Decca, Guitar Masters, Sesac and Luthier Music.

Morel is also recognised for his teaching and commitment to new musicians.
