= Nikos Christodoulou =

Greek conductor and composer

- Born: 1959 (age 65–66); Athens, Greece
- Occupation: Conductor

Nikos Christodoulou (Greek: Νίκος Χριστοδούλου, born 1959) is a Greek conductor and composer, and the music director of the City of Athens Symphony Orchestra and Choir.

He is also the founder of the New Symphony Orchestra of Athens and the Euro Youth Philharmonic.

== Biography ==
Nikos Christodoulou studied composition in Athens with J.A. Papaioannou and the piano. He furthered his composition studies at the Hochschule für Musik in Munich, and his conducting studies at the Royal College of Music in London.

From 1977 to 1981, Nikos Christodoulou was an associate composer and adviser at Greek National Radio.

Among other symphonic works he conducts Skalkottas, which he has recorded. He was also a teacher at the Hellenic Conservatory, and makes regular appearances at the Greek National Opera. He led the first Helios Festival, a tribute event dedicated to Carl Nielsen in Athens, and initiated the Nikos Skalkottas Tage at the Konzerthaus Berlin.

== Discography ==
- 1999: Piano Concerto No. 1 with the Iceland Symphony Orchestra
- 2004: Piano Concerto No. 3 with the Caput Ensemble
- 2005: Piano Concerto No. 2 with the BBC Symphony Orchestra
