= Natalia Pravosudovich =

Natalia Mikhailovna Pravosudovich (14 Aug. 1899 Vilnius - 2 Sep. 1988 Meran, Italy) was a Russian/Lithuanian composer who worked in many genres through at least opus 64, including five symphonies and concerti for cello, clarinet, flute, piano, string quartet, and violin. She also wrote a memoir about her studies with Arnold Schoenberg.

== Biography ==
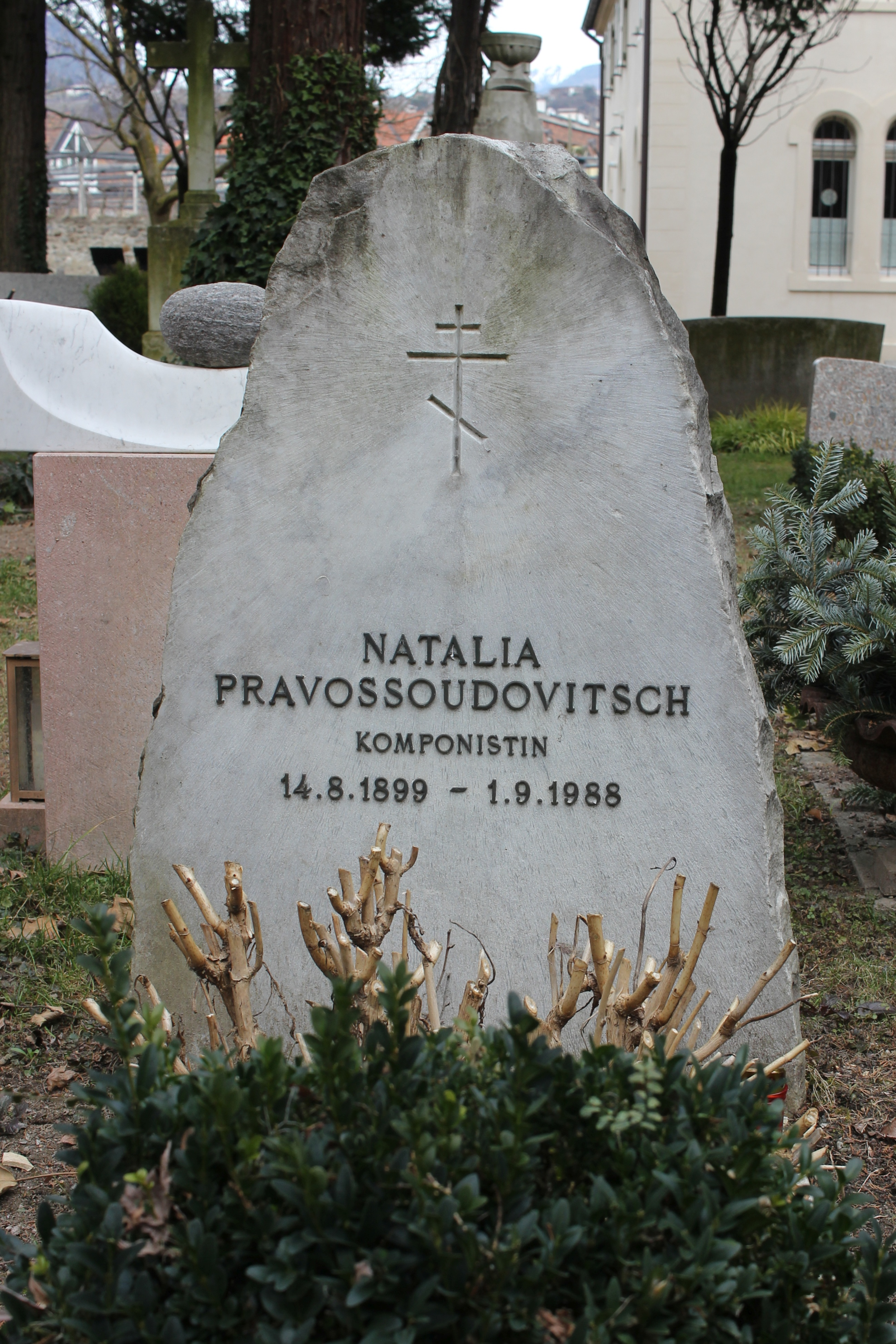
Her grave in Meran cemetery

Pravosudovich was born in Vilnius (today in Lithuania). She began piano lessons as a young child, then attended the Leningrad Conservatory (today the St. Petersburg Conservatory) from 1918 to 1925, and the Berlin Academy of Arts from 1929 to 1931. Her teachers included N. Chernov, Alexander Glazunov, Sergei Lyapunov, Arnold Schoenberg, Vera Scriabina, and Maximilian Steinberg. She studied with classmates Alfred Keller, Peter Schacht, Nikos Skalkottas, and Norbert von Hannenheim.

In 1929, Pravosudovich's mother died. Her father, a railway engineer, was arrested on charges of sabotage and executed. In 1931 Pravosudovich moved to Merano, Italy to improve her health and live at the Borodin Foundation, a residence for Russian exiles. In 1932, she submitted her Concerto for String Quartet and Chamber Orchestra to Schoenberg as her diploma thesis. From 1941 to 1956, Pravosudovich stopped composing and worked as a seamstress and language teacher. She resumed composing in 1956. In 1962, her Piano Sonata Opus 13, composed in1926, won first prize at the Premio Helena Rubinstein, an international composition competition in Buenos Aires. Despite increasing vision problems, Pavosudovich continuted composing until 1983. She also belonged to the International Working Group on Women and Music. Several of her compositions reflect her religious beliefs as a member of the Russian Orthodox Church.

== Works ==
Her works included a book of reminiscences: Meister Arnold Schoenberg und meine Berliner Erinnerungen and numerous compositions.

=== Compositions ===
==== Chamber music ====
- Cello Sonata, opus 28
- Duet, opus 31 (flute and clarinet)
- String Quartet No. 1
- String Quartet No. 2
- String Trio, opus 36
- Trio, opus 33 (two violins and cello)

==== Orchestral music ====
- Concerto for Cello
- Concerto for Clarinet
- Concerto for Flute
- Concerto for Piano
- Concerto for Violin
- Concerto for String Quartet and Chamber Orchestra
- Symphonies #1 - 5

==== Piano music ====
- Pieces for Children
- Prelude, opus 48
- Preludes and Fugues, opus 52-54, 56-60, 63
- Sonata, opus 13
- Suites No. 1 - 3, opus 46, 47, 55

==== Vocal music ====
- “Berceuse,” opus 39 (text by Safirio)
- Cantata La Vie d’un Heros
- Drei Deutsche Lieder, opus 27 (text by Pravosudovich)
- Drei Lieder, opus 18 (text by Pravosudovich)
- Passion und Auferstehung, opus 34 (Easter music for mixed chorus and orchestra)
- Songs on Russian Texts, opus 18
- Three German Songs, opus 27
- Tre Composi, opus 24 (text by Hans Schwarz)
