= Ilse Brüll =

Ilse Brüll (1925–1942) was an Austrian-Jewish girl killed at Auschwitz who became a symbol in Austria for young girls murdered by Nazis in the Holocaust.

== Life ==
Born on April 28, 1925, in Innsbruck, Austria to an assimilated Jewish family, her parents were Rudolf Brüll (1887-1957) a furniture manufacturer, and Julie Brüll (née Steinharter 1894–1971).

When Austria merged with Nazi Germany in the Anschluss of 1938, the Brüll family, like all families of Jewish heritage, were persecuted by the Nazis. Jews were forced out of professions and their property stolen through "Aryanization" (the forced transfer to non-Jews) or outright seizure. Brüll's schooling ended in November 1938 due to the Nazi's anti-Jewish pogrom known as Kristallnacht. Her family was beaten.

Her family tried unsuccessfully to emigrate. In April 1939 her family tried to save her and her cousin Inge by putting the girls on a Kindertransport to the Netherlands. She found refuge in a convent for several years, However, in 1942, her hiding place was discovered and she was deported to the Westerbork transit camp and in August of the same year she was transported to Auschwitz, where, according to witnesses, she was murdered on September 3, 1942. Her parents survived imprisonment and returned to Innsbruck in 1945.

== Commemorations ==
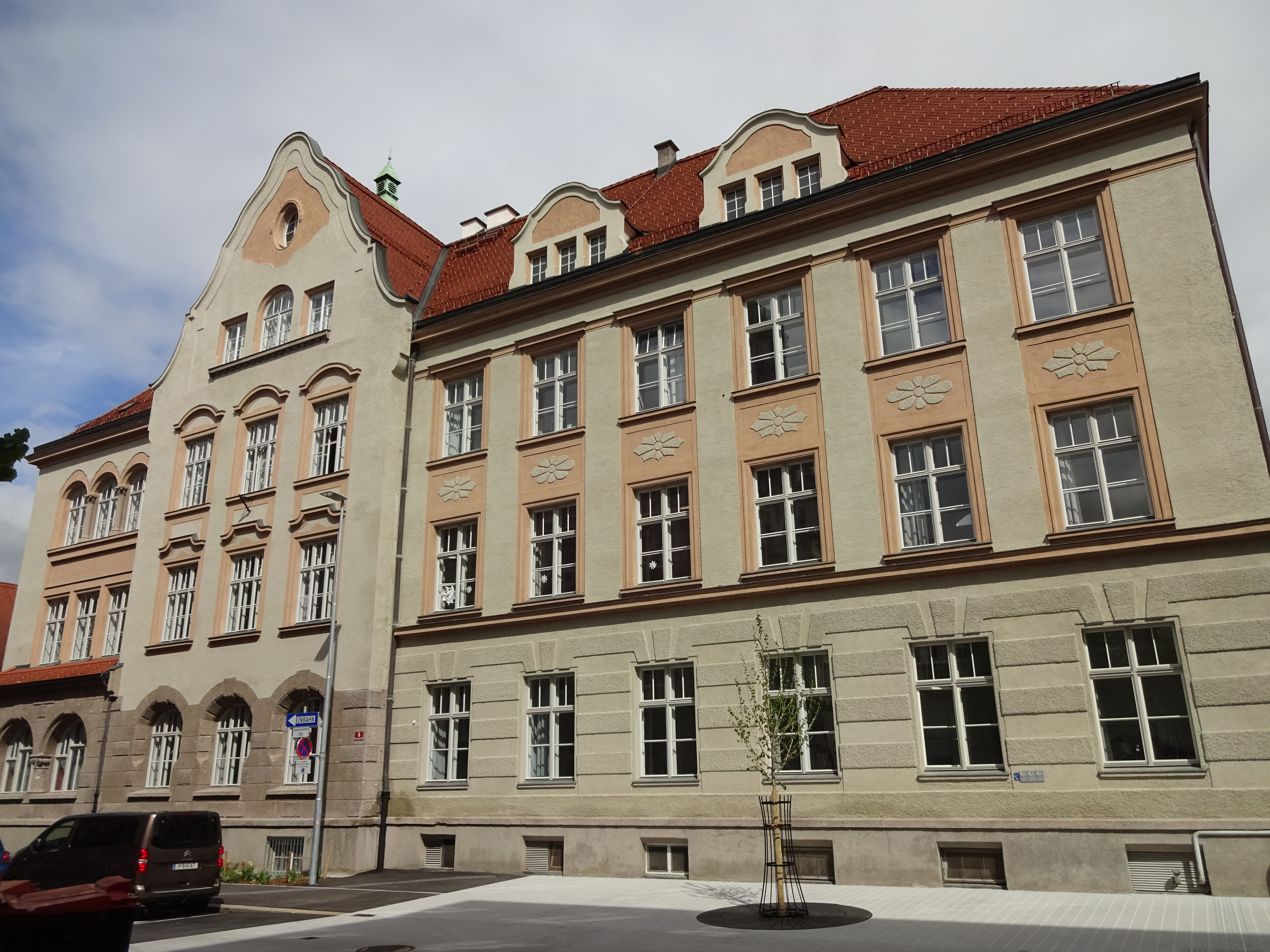
Mittelschule Ilse-Brüll-Gasse

A Stolperstein was laid for her in 2004. A street and a school in Innsbruck are named after her. Commemorative projects honor her memory.

== See also ==
- History of the Jews in Innsbruck
- The Holocaust in Austria
- The Holocaust in the Netherlands
