= Paul Pisk =

American classical composer

Paul Amadeus Pisk (May 16, 1893, Vienna – January 12, 1990, Los Angeles) was an Austrian-born composer and musicologist. A prize named in his honor is the highest award for a graduate student paper at the annual meeting of the American Musicological Society.

Pisk earned his doctorate in musicology from University of Vienna in 1916, studying under Guido Adler. Afterwards he studied conducting at the University of Music and Performing Arts Vienna graduating in 1919. His teachers there included Franz Schreker (counterpoint). Pisk also studied privately with Arnold Schoenberg from 1917 to 1919. He then taught at the Academy of Fine Arts Vienna and gave adult education lectures, especially at the Volkshochschule Volksheim Ottakring, where from 1922 to 1934 he was director of the music department. He also taught at the New Vienna Conservatory from 1925 to 1926 and the Austro-American Conservatory near Salzburg from 1931 to 1933.

He was also a board member, secretary, and pianist in Schoenberg's Society for Private Musical Performances. He was among the founding members of the International Society for Contemporary Music and from 1920 to 1928 was coeditor of Musikblätter des Anbruch and music editor of the Arbeiter-Zeitung.

The first airing of his music by the BBC took place on July 3, 1930, when Austrian pianist Friedrich Wührer played Pisk's Suite for Piano.

In 1936 he emigrated to the United States and taught at the University of Redlands (1937–1951), the University of Texas at Austin (1951–1963), and in the College of Arts and Sciences at Washington University in St. Louis (1963–1972). He composed orchestral works, ballets, chamber music and songs, as well as writings in music theory. His notable students include Leopold Spinner, Samuel Adler, Gary Lee Nelson, and Thomas F. Hulbert.

== Personal history ==
Paul's parents were Ludwig Pisk, a secular Jewish lawyer, and Eugenie Pollack, a Protestant. Pisk was the elder of two sons; his younger brother was named Otto. They were raised Protestant. Their mother died when Pisk was four. Ludwig remarried and his second wife also bore a son. Otto and Pisk both served in the Habsburg Army in World War I. Paul was a supply sergeant for the cavalry.

In 1935 Pisk was made an honorary member of the Le Droit Humain masonic lodge "Humanitas" No. 962 in Zagreb during the era of the Kingdom of Yugoslavia.

Pisk married Martha Maria Frank in 1919. She was from a once-wealthy family from the Habsburg region near Czernowitz. They had two children. Martha died in 1973, only a few months after she and Pisk had moved back to Austin, Texas, from St. Louis.

After her death, Pisk moved to Los Angeles and remarried. He had known his second wife, singer and voice coach Irene Hanna (born Johanna Schwartz) for many years. Hanna died in 1981. Pisk died in Los Angeles in 1990.

== Major publications ==
- PA Pisk, "Max Reger, Briefwechsel mit Herzog Georg II von Sachsen-Meiningen." Journal of the American Musicological Society, Vol. 3, No. 2,149-151. Summer, 1950. JSTOR 829816
- PA Pisk – "Subdivision of Tones: A Modern Music Theory and Philosophy" Bulletin of the American Musicological Society, 1942, v.36 JSTOR 829215
- PA Pisk "The Fugue Themes in Bach's Well-Tempered Clavier" Bulletin of the American Musicological Society, No. 8 (Oct., 1945), pp. 28–29- JSTOR 829395

Compositions :

- Der große Regenmacher, 1931 (szenisches Ballett)
- Schattenseite, 1931 (Monodram)
- Passacaglia for orchestra
- String quartet
