= Kostas Grigoreas =

Important Greek classical guitarist and composer

Kostas Grigoreas Κώστας Γρηγορέας
- Birth name: Konstantinos Grigoreas
- Born: May 6, 1957 (age 68); Athens, Greece
- Origin: Greek
- Genres: classical, folk, guitar music
- Occupation(s): musician, composer, guitar teacher
- Instrument: classical guitar
- Years active: 1978–present
- Website: https://grigoreas.com/

Kostas Grigoreas (born May 6, 1957) is a Greek classical guitarist, composer, and teacher.

== Studies ==
Kostas Grigoreas was born in Athens in 1957. He studied classical guitar, advanced music theory, and music technology. First learned to play the guitar when he was eight and later enrolled in the National Conservatory of Greece, studying with Dimitri Fampas.

He continued his studies in the UK, as a scholar of the British Council. He studied at the Royal Northern College of Music under Gordon Crosskey and John Williams (classical guitar), as well as with pianist and conductor George Hadjinikos (advanced theory and music analysis), obtaining a Postgraduate diploma from the University of Manchester.

== Music career ==
Kostas Grigoreas' activities include music performance, music composition, recordings, music production, articles, as well as classical guitar teaching.

As a classical guitar soloist, he has appeared in concerts (onstage or via electronic media) in Greece, in most European countries, in America, and the Far East.

He has been a long-time collaborator of such Greek composers and songwriters as Manos Hadjidakis, Mikis Theodorakis, Nikos Mamangakis and Kyriakos Tzortzinakis, singers such as Savina Yannatou, Aliki Kayaloglou, Maria Dimitriadi and Nena Venetsanou, as well as significant Greek and foreign performing musicians.

Kostas Grigoreas' compositional oeuvre lays emphasis on the classical guitar as a solo instrument or as part of an ensemble. His influences include the classical repertoire, traditional and modern Greek music, as well as various contemporary musical styles.

Most of his compositions have been published and presented in concerts, in discography and on the internet.

He is active in the field of audio and video recording, both as a composer and as a recording artist (solo guitar, voice and guitar, chamber music, film music). He has participated in a significant number of physical and streaming music albums of Greek discography.
