= Leopold Spinner =

Austrian-born British composer and editor

Leopold Spinner (26 April 1906 – 12 August 1980) was an Austrian-born, British-domiciled composer and editor.

== Biography ==
Spinner was born of Austrian parentage in Lemberg (now Lviv, Ukraine, Lwów, Poland during the interwar period). From 1926 to 1930 he studied composition in Vienna with Paul Amadeus Pisk and afterwards began to attract international attention with works which were performed at the ISCM Festivals or awarded prizes. Nevertheless, from 1935 to 1938 he underwent a second period of study, as a pupil of Anton Webern. He may be regarded as a representative of the so-called Second Viennese School.

Fearing Nazi persecution Spinner emigrated to England in 1939 and spent the war years in Yorkshire, working part of the time as a lathe operator in a locomotive factory in Bradford. From 1947 he worked as a music-copyist and arranger for Boosey & Hawkes, moving to London in 1954. In 1958 he succeeded Erwin Stein as editor at Boosey & Hawkes, later becoming Chief Editor. He remained with Boosey & Hawkes until his retirement in 1975. His skills and exactitude were highly praised by Stravinsky.

== Compositions ==
From 1926 to his death in London in 1980 Spinner steadily and painstakingly built up an individual body of work, adapting and renewing classical forms along the lines (but eventually, much further) that had been indicated by his teacher Webern. His early works include a String Trio (1932), the Symphony for small orchestra (1933), the Little Quartet (1934) and the Passacaglia for 11 Instruments (1934). These were all heard at ISCM concerts during the 1930s. However, only one of his pre-war compositions, the Sonata for Violin and Piano (1936), was given an opus number, an indication that his previous life was behind him once he left Vienna.

Post war pieces include an Ouvertüre in honour of Schoenberg's 70th birthday (1944), a Piano Concerto (1947, later revised as a Concerto for piano with chamber orchestra), a Violin Concerto (1953–55, though this remained in pencil score), Prelude and Variations dedicated to Stravinsky (1962), Ricercata for orchestra (1965), Cantatas on poems of Nietzsche (1951) and on German folksong texts (1964), string quartets, trios, works for violin and piano, solo piano pieces, several sets of songs and some arrangements of Irish folksongs. His last work was a Chamber Symphony (1977–79).

Michael Graubart has championed Spinner's music in articles and performances. In 1982 he conducted the first performances of two works from 1971 in London: The Wind Sonata, Op. 23 and the Two Songs, Op. 24 for soprano and six instruments. Malcolm Hayes highlighted the unusual scoring of the Wind Sonata (D clarinet, oboe, horn and bassoon), and its evocation of the sound world of Viennese expressionism, but combined with the articulation and clarity more associated with late Stravinsky. The Two Songs, in which the soloist is accompanied by flute, oboe, alto saxophone, guitar and celeste, show a calmer and more lyrical side to Spinner's music despite the intense polyphony and motivic control, and "the tendency of Spinner's harmonic ear towards consonance".

== Technique ==
Almost all Spinner's music was written according to the twelve-tone technique (on which he also wrote a significant textbook, A Short Introduction to the Technique of Twelve-tone Composition, published 1960). His early works, up to and including the Zwei kleine Stücke, are clearly influenced by Berg and middle-period Schoenberg. From the mid-1930s the general idiom, expressive intensity, dramatic economy and impeccable craftsmanship bear witness to his admiration for his teacher Webern – and, through Webern, for the whole Austro-German tradition from Bach onwards. Spinner himself carried that tradition a stage further. While retaining the purity and thematically essentialized textures of Webern, his works show a concern for larger and bolder gestures than Webern's norm. In his later music, beginning with the sonatina for piano, the expressive pressure applied to strict motivic working results in a wholly individual style of almost explosive force.
