= Paul Hamburger =

British musician

Paul Hamburger (3 September 1920, Vienna – 11 April 2004, London) was a British pianist, accompanist, chamber musician, and scholar.

Paul Hamburger was born in Vienna in 1920, and studied at the Vienna State Academy before emigrating to England in 1939. In 1941, he received a scholarship to attend the Royal College of Music, London, studying with Frank Merrick, Gordon Jacob and Ralph Vaughan Williams, and he obtained his ARCM. From 1945, he started on a career as an accompanist, chamber musician and teacher, and was associated in concerts and on disc with many distinguished singers and instrumentalists, including Dame Janet Baker, Elisabeth Söderström, Max Rostal and Pierre Fournier. He performed both in Britain and abroad, including Germany, Austria, Switzerland, the Netherlands, France and Belgium. Malcolm Arnold dedicated his Concerto for Piano Duet and Strings, op. 32 of 1951 to Hamburger and his piano duet partner, the composer pianist Helen Pyke. Fellow exile Líza Fuchsová was also a duet partner, between 1954 and 1975.

Hamburger worked as coach for the English Chamber Group, preparing for the television performance of Benjamin Britten's The Turn of the Screw and touring with the company. He was also coach at Glyndebourne Opera, working on Fidelio, Alceste, The Rake’s Progress, Arlecchino, many Rossini operas and all the Mozart operas. He coached the singers in Erich Leinsdorf's recording of Die Walküre with Birgit Nilsson. For twelve years, he held the post of official accompanist at the BBC, and was later the BBC producer responsible for the "Artists of the Younger Generation" series.

Hamburger taught singers and accompanists at the Guildhall School of Music and Drama, London, and gave masterclasses and annual seminars in England, Scotland, Ireland, Germany, Austria, Sweden and Finland. His literary works include an edition of Mozart Lieder (Oxford University Press), contributions to books on Mozart songs, Mahler's Wunderhorn songs, Chopin and Britten, and translations, notably of Bruno Walter and Alfred Brendel.

He was a Fellow of the Guildhall School of Music and Drama, an Honorary Member of the Royal Academy, London, and was awarded the Austrian Cross of Honour for Science and Art in 1991, which was upgraded to 1st class in 2000.
