= Michael Graubart =

English conductor, composer and academic (1930–2024)

- Born: 26 November 1930; Vienna, Austria
- Died: 10 June 2024 (aged 93); London, England
- Education: University of Manchester, studied composition with Mátyás Seiber
- Occupation(s): Conductor, composer, academic
- Known for: Head of music at Morley College, conductor of contemporary and early music, senior lecturer at the Royal Northern College of Music
- Notable work: Aria (1973), String Quartet (2000)

Michael Graubart (26 November 1930 – 10 June 2024) was an Austrian-born British conductor, composer and academic, born in Vienna and exiled after the Anschluss. He lived and worked in London and Manchester for the rest of his life.

Graubart was born into an Austrian Jewish family. Following the murder of his uncle Richard Graubart in 1938 the family escaped to the UK by train. He studied physics at the University of Manchester University, graduating in 1952, and worked as an electronics engineer for EMI for several years. After that he taught mathematics, physics and music at various schools and colleges.

== Musical career ==
After studying composition with Mátyás Seiber, flute with Geoffrey Gilbert and conducting with Lawrence Leonard, Graubart became a teacher and conductor at Morley College and was appointed head of department in 1969 when John Gardner retired, staying there until 1991. He began conducting various professional and amateur choirs and orchestras, including the Hampstead Chamber Orchestra from 1962 until 1966. From 1962 to 1972 he was also musical director of the Focus Opera Group. In 1969 he conducted the world premiere of the opera Isis and Osiris by Elisabeth Lutyens, and conducted the British premiere of Viktor Ullmann's opera The Emperor of Atlantis in 1981.

In 1991 Graubart was appointed senior lecturer at the Royal Northern College of Music, where he directed the new music ensemble Akanthos. He published articles and reviews in musical journals including Composer, Encounter, Tempo and The Musical Times and edited early music, including operas by Monteverdi and Pergolesi.

He retired from full-time teaching in 1996 but continued to lecture and to compose orchestral, chamber, instrumental and choral music. As a composer he adopted the Viennese 12-note tradition using clear motifs and themes, sometimes incorporating electronics. His works include the orchestral piece Aria (1973), and a string quartet (2000), which has been performed by the Arditti Quartet and others.

Graubart died in London on 10 June 2024, at the age of 93.

== See also ==
- List of émigré composers in Britain
