= Felix Werder =

Australian composer (1922–2012)

Felix Werder AM (24 February 1922 – 3 May 2012) was a German-born Australian composer of classical and electronic music, and also a noted critic and educator. The son of a distinguished liturgical composer, he composed all his life. His published and recorded music includes symphonies, chamber music for all combinations, solo concerti, choral works and operas.

== Biography ==
Werder was born in Berlin, Germany, as Felix Bischofswerder, the son of the composer Boaz Bischofswerder, who was a member of Arnold Schoenberg's circle. He studied Fine Arts and Architecture in London before arriving in Australia in 1940 on the HMT Dunera, along with his father, leaving Germany because of their Jewish heritage. They were interned at a camp in Tatura, Victoria for the duration of World War II. In 1943, he wrote his first symphony. In 1946 his father died.

During the 1960s and early 1970s, Werder wrote seven operas, which were popularly received. His opera Private was commissioned for television by the ABC and was broadcast in 1969. He also wrote works for Deutsche Oper Berlin and Opera Australia among others.

Werder lived in Melbourne and his teaching included influential courses in electronic music and sound synthesis. His students in the mid-1970s included Ollie Olsen who became a leading figure in Melbourne's little band scene, Whirlywirld and Max Q, and bandmate Arne Hanna. Other students included Andrew Duffield (Models) and Karen Ansel (The Reels).

Werder was appointed a Member of the Order of Australia in 1976. He received the Stamitz Performance Prize (1984), the Australia Council Fellowship (1986), the Arts Guild of Germany Composition Prize (1988), the Stamitz Prize (1988), and an honorary doctorate in Music from the University of Melbourne.

He formed the performance ensemble Australia Felix, which toured Europe and included Bruce Clarke, Merlyn Quaife, Brian Brown, Alex Grieve, Judy Easton, Tony Conolan, Kevin Makin and Peter Clinch. For many years, during the 1960s and 1970s, he wrote music criticism for the Melbourne newspaper The Age.

On 24 February 2012 a concert was held at the Iwaki Auditorium, Melbourne, to celebrate Werder's 90th birthday. The concert included the premiere of three new works: "Ill-Tempered Clavier" (2009) and "Dice" (2010)", both performed by Michael Kieran Harvey; and "H Factor", a work that Werder said would be his final composition, performed by the Silo String Quartet. Also, percussionist Eugene Ughetti performed "Quinney on the Roof" and "Recipe for Disaster"; Warren Burt presented a digital restoration of Werder's 4-speaker piece for analogue synthesizer "The Tempest", originally recorded and released in 1974.

Werder died in Melbourne on 3 May 2012 aged 90, and was interred at the Springvale Botanical Cemetery.

== Personal life ==
Whilst in the army in 1944, he married Mena Waten, the sister of the novelist Judah Waten. In 1976, aged 54, he married Vera Philipp, whose first husband had been on the Dunera with Werder. Her family were also refugees from Europe in the 1930s.

== Operas ==
- Kisses for a Quid (1961)
- The General (1966)
- Agamemnon (1967)
- The Affair (1969)
- Private (1969)
- The Vicious Square (1971)
- The Conversion (1973)
- Medea (1985)

== Discography ==
- 1973 LP Felix Werder's Banker, Discovery Stereos GYS 001 (Greg Young Production)
- 1974 LP Music by Felix Werder, Volume 2, Mopoke GYS 002 (Greg Young Production)
- 1977 LP Agamemnon
- 1970s LP Requiem
- 1992 CD Machine Messages, ACMA Vol 1
- 2007 CD The Tempest/Electronic Music (reissue compilation)

== Awards and nominations ==
=== APRA Awards ===
The APRA Awards are presented annually from 1982 by the Australasian Performing Right Association (APRA). They include the Classical Music Awards which are distributed by APRA and the Australian Music Centre (AMC).

Year	Nominee / work	Award	Result
2004	Werder	Long-Term Contribution to the Advancement of Australian Music	Won

=== Don Banks Music Award ===
The Don Banks Music Award was established in 1984 to publicly honour a senior artist of high distinction who has made an outstanding and sustained contribution to music in Australia. It was founded by the Australia Council in honour of Don Banks, Australian composer, performer and the first chair of its music board.

Year	Nominee / work	Award	Result
1986	Felix Werder	Don Banks Music Award	awarded
