= Evangelos & Liza =

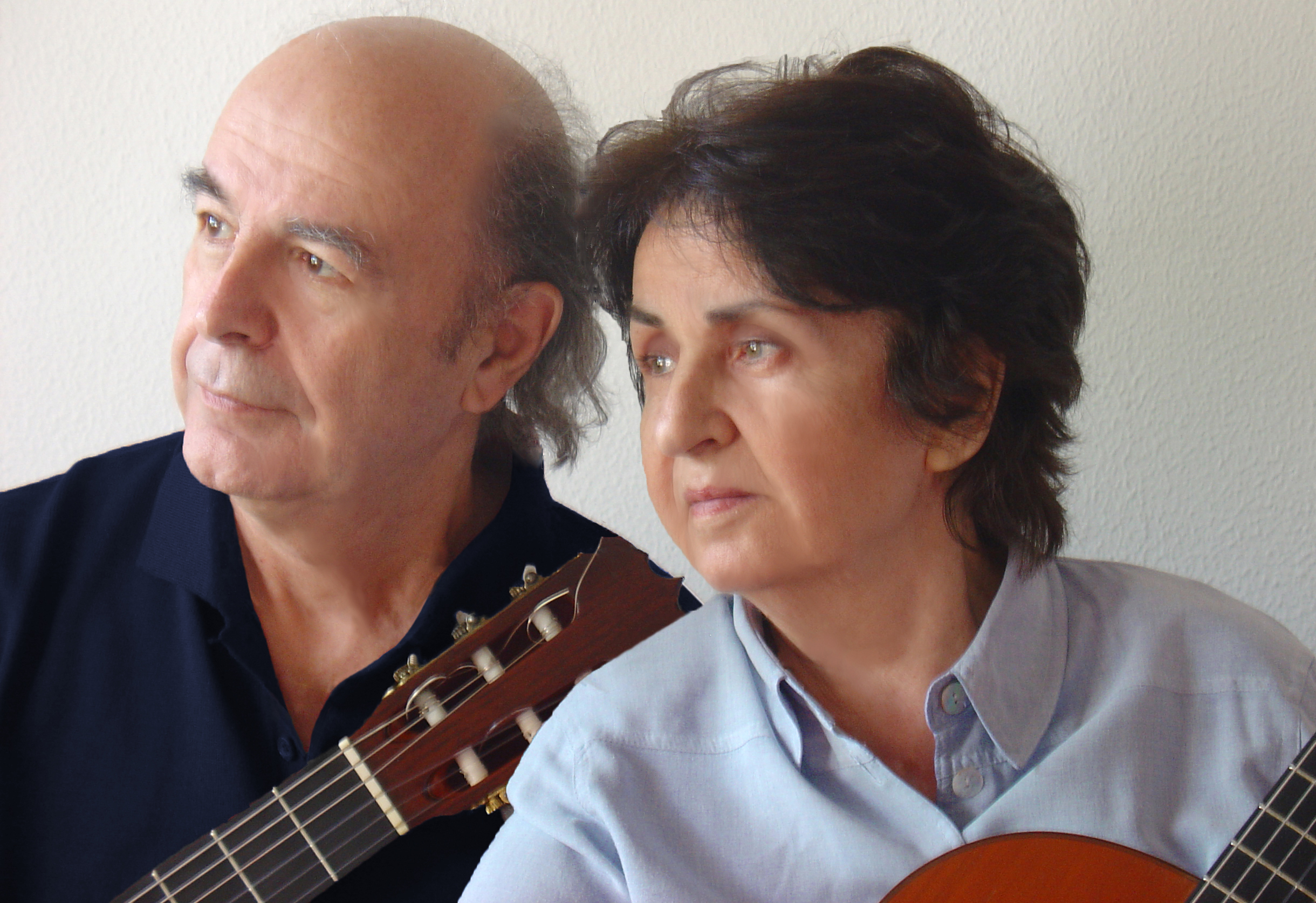

Background information
- Genres: classical guitar
- Years active: 1963–present
- Members: Evangelos Assimakopoulos and Liza Zoe
- Website: evangelos-liza.com

Evangelos & Liza is a classical guitar duo from Greece consisting of Evangelos Assimakopoulos, born in Agrinion, Greece on 10 September 1940 and Liza Zoe, born in Missolonghi, Greece on 8 August 1940. The couple has toured in Europe, U.S. and Canada and serves on the faculty of the Athenaeum Conservatory of Athens.

== Studies ==
From 1953 both Assimakopoulos and Zoe studied the guitar at the National Conservatory in Athens under Dimitris Fampas. After receiving First Prizes and the Medals for Outstanding Performance upon graduating, they shared the first two prizes in the International Competition in Naples, Italy in 1960. From the late 1950s they both gave many solo recitals throughout Greece.

They became professors of the guitar at the National Conservatory of Athens in 1962, started playing as a duo in 1963, establishing Greece's first guitar duo, known as the Athenian Guitar Duo, and were married in 1965. Their son Marios, born in December 1969, is a civil engineer.

For four consecutive periods Evangelos & Liza were awarded scholarships to study with the Presti-Lagoya duo in France and with Andrés Segovia in Spain.

== Career ==
Since 1967 the couple has toured all over the world and given hundreds of recitals in major concert halls, performed for many radio and television stations and taken part in many festivals. They also appear as duo soloists with symphony orchestras, as well as teaching seminars and holding master-classes at universities and academies overseas.

In 1970 The New York Times wrote of them "...at Carnegie Recital Hall last night the society [of Classic Guitar] presented a pair of talented visitors from Greece...the Athenian Duo".

A number of composers such as Mario Castelnuovo-Tedesco, John W. Duarte and Jorge Morel have written pieces for Evangelos and Liza, and the two musicians have written their own transcriptions and arrangements of classical composers such as J. S. Bach, Scarlatti, Chopin and de Falla.

Since 1991 they have organized the yearly Guitar Festival of Patras, a four-day musical event which includes master-classes, lectures, concerts and guitar competitions. Oscar Ghiglia, Roland Dyens, Marcin Dylla and other well-known guitarists have taken part in this institution.

Evangelos & Liza have produced several records and CDs of works for one and two guitars and they have also published 28 books with works for guitar solo and duo. Over their 50 years of teaching they have established a school of guitarists known both in Greece and abroad.

== Guitar discography ==
LP:

- The Art of two Guitars
- Musique Baroque pour Deux Guitares
- Romantic Music for two Guitars
- Spanish Music for two Guitars
- Evangelos & Liza play Solo Music by Weiss & Albeniz
- Evangelos Assimakopoulos plays Isaac Albeniz

CD:

- Evangelos & Liza play the Romantics
- Baroque Music for two Guitars
- Evangelos & Liza Play Solo Music by Albeniz & Weiss
- Spanish Guitar Music 'Recuerdos de la Alhambra'
- Latin American Guitar Music 'El Decameron Negro'
- Evangelos & Liza play the Fandango by A.Soler
- The Guitar in Latin America 'Carora'
- Double Cd: 50 Years of Guitar Artistry
- Celebrated Pieces for Classical Guitar 'Romanza'
