= Boaz Bischofswerder =

German-Australian composer (1895–1946)

Boaz Bischofswerder (25 February 1895 – 28 June 1946) was a German Rabbi and composer. He is arguably best known for being the father of leading German/Australian contemporary composer Felix Werder.

Bischofswerder was born on 25 February 1895, in Lublin, Poland. Later, having moved to Berlin, he rose to the position of Rabbi of the reformed synagogue of Brunenstrasse. In 1933 Bischofswerder and his family left Germany because of their Jewish heritage, and went to live in London. Then in 1940 Bischofswerder was deported as an enemy alien to Australia, on board the HMT Dunera, along with his son Felix. Bischofswerder died on 28 June 1946 at St. Ronan's Private Hospital, Malvern, Victoria. Apart from his sons Felix and Manfred, Boaz was also survived by his wife Helene.

In 1996 the Archive of Australian Judaica, located at the University of Sydney published a collection of Bischofswerder's musical works. In 1998, Bischofswerder was the subject of a documentary, directed by Naomi Bishops, produced by Peter Tammer, for the VCA School of Film & Television. In the documentary "Two sons tell the story of their father, Boaz Bischofs Werder, a rabbi and musician who flees fascist Germany but is caught in an unexpected turn of events. The brothers' title of their father's journey reveals much of their own distinct life paths."
