= John Brecknock =

Brecknock in the title role of Werther

John Leighton Brecknock (29 November 1937 – 30 May 2017) was an English operatic tenor. He was born at Long Eaton, Derbyshire, joined the chorus of Sadler's Wells Opera in 1967 and graduated to small solo roles. He made his Covent Garden debut in 1974 as Fenton in Verdi's Falstaff with Tito Gobbi. In 1977 he co-starred at the Paris Opéra with Teresa Berganza in Rossini's La Cenerentola, and in 1978 sang Don Ottavio in Mozart's Don Giovanni at the Metropolitan Opera, New York, to the Donna Anna of Joan Sutherland, who wrote of his "beautiful glossy voice and easy technique". In London he performed at English National Opera, the Royal Opera and the Proms.

Among Brecknock's Mozart roles were a priest and an armed man in The Magic Flute, Ferrando in Così fan tutte and Belmonte in The Seraglio. In the Italian repertoire, his roles included Alfredo in La traviata, the Count in The Barber of Seville, Rinuccio in Gianni Schicchi and the title role in Count Ory. Among his roles in French operas were the title role in Werther, Iopas in Les Troyens, Romeo in Romeo and Juliet, Des Grieux in Manon and Bénédict in Béatrice et Bénédict.

Brecknock's repertoire included several opéras comiques and operettas. His Offenbach roles included the title characters in Bluebeard and Robinson Crusoe, Paris in La belle Hélène, and Pluto in Orpheus in the Underworld. In Gilbert and Sullivan he sang the Defendant in Trial by Jury, and Tolloller in Iolanthe.

In less-frequently performed operas Brecknock's roles included the Page in Monteverdi's The Coronation of Poppea, Jupiter in Handel's Semele, and Adriano in Meyerbeer's Il crociato in Egitto.
