= George Hadjinikos =

Greek musician (1923–2015)

George Hadjinikos (Greek: Γιώργος Χατζηνίκος; Volos, 3 May 1923 – Athens, 29 November 2015) was a Greek piano soloist, conductor, teacher, and author.

== Biography ==
Hadjinikos was born in Volos, Greece in 1923. He began his musical education as a child at the Volos Conservatoire in Greece. After moving to Athens in 1934, he continued at the Athens Conservatoire, graduating in 1943 with a piano diploma and a degree in harmony. During this period, he decided to abandon his studies at the Faculty of Law at the University of Athens and devote himself exclusively to music.

During his youth, he was a close friend of the great Greek composer Manos Hadjidakis and according to what Hadjinikos had confided to his student and mutual friend Kostas Grigoreas, he was, unofficially, one of Hadjidakis piano teachers.

After World War II, he continued his studies at the Mozarteum in Salzburg and graduated with piano and conducting diplomas in 1948–1949. He was a recipient of the Lilly Lehmann Medal of the Mozarteum International Foundation. In Salzburg, he met such musicians as Johann Nepomuk David and Paul Hindemith. Hadjinikos had performed several works of Hindemith, including the second European performance, in Salzburg, of the 2nd version of "Das Marienleben."

In 1951, Hadjinikos moved from Salzburg to Munich, where he studied with Carl Orff. Their subsequent friendship continued until Orff's death. In Germany, he gave 80 recitals, in co-operation with the American Information Center, following his performance of Aaron Copland's Piano Sonata in its European premiere. In 1952, Hadjinikos first encountered one of Nikos Skalkottas's works, and he subsequently became an authority on the composer. From 1952 to 1957, he lived in Hamburg, where he studied with Eduard Erdmann at the Hochschule für Musik.

In October 1953, Hadjinikos gave the world premiere in Hamburg of Skalkottas' Piano Concerto No. 2 with the NWDR Symphony Orchestra (now the NDR Symphony) under the baton of Hermann Scherchen. For this performance, Hadjinikos received a microfilm with the extremely illegible full score, and had to copy the piano part with a magnifying glass in order to learn his part. This performance caused the BBC to take an interest in the work, leading to its subsequent broadcast and the publication of Hans Keller's article 'Nikos Skalkottas: An Original Genius', and subsequent advocacy by Keller for Skalkottas' music in Britain. In December 1954, he discovered several lost Skalkottas manuscripts in a second-hand bookshop in Berlin, for the Octet, two String Quartets, and the Piano Concerto No. 1. From 1957 to 1960, Hadjinikos lived in France, including a period in Paris. A 1959 tour in the Soviet Union included a meeting with Heinrich Neuhaus, who inspired Hadjinikos in the career direction of teaching.

After a brief residence in Switzerland of less than a year, in 1961, Hadjinikos joined the piano faculty of the Royal Manchester College of Music (now the Royal Northern College of Music) in the UK. He remained on the faculty for 27 years until his retirement in 1988. In addition to piano, he taught conducting, music history, chamber music, as well as on topics such as 'Harmonization of Praxis and Theory'. In Manchester, he established the "New Manchester Ensemble", which gave performances of such composers as Arnold Schoenberg, Igor Stravinsky, Nikos Skalkottas, Roberto Gerhard, Tōru Takemitsu, György Ligeti, Jani Christou, and Iannis Xenakis. He continued his scholarship, advocacy and performances of the music of Skalkottas, including conducting the world premiere of the Piano Concerto No. 3, giving the world premiere of the 'Five Works for Winds and Piano', the London premiere of the Bassoon Sonata, performing as soloist in the world premiere of the Piano Concerto No. 1, and conducting the world premiere of the Double Bass Concerto. He also led regional orchestras in Hoylake and South Manchester, as well as the Bury Symphony Orchestra.

Hadjinikos authored two books, one about Skalkottas accompanied with two CDs, and a book on about Mozart's opera recitatives. He taught extensively throughout his life, and in many countries. Some of his pupils who studied closely with him for years, included Gilbert Biberian, Paul Galbraith, Kostas Grigoreas, Richard Ward-Roden, Teodor Currentzis, Trefor Smith, Robyn Koh, Dafydd Bullock, Smaro Gregoriadou, Christos Marinos, Nikos Adraskelas, and Yiorgo Moutsiaras. In 1990, the University of Pavia awarded him the 'Ugo Foscolo' Medal for his offerings in European Music. He died on 29 November 2015, in Athens.

== Recordings ==
- Skalkottas, Nikos: Concerto No.2 for Piano and Orchestra; George Hadjinikos (piano), Hamburg Radio Symphony Orchestra cond. Hermann Scherchen (1953). Arkadia CDGI 768.1 (CD 1993)

== Editions ==
- N. Skalkottas: Concertino for 2 Pianos and Orchestra, Universal Edition, Dec. 1968
- N. Skalkottas: 10 Piano Pieces from '32 Piano Pieces', Universal Edition

== Writings ==
=== Books ===
- Hadjinikos, George: 'W. A. Mozart - European Musician', published by the Cultural Foundation "G. Angelinis - Pia Hadjinikos", 1991 (in Greek Language)
- Hadjinikos, George: 'Nikos Skalkottas - A renewed approach to musical thought and interpretation', Nefeli Publishing, 2006 (in Greek language, contains two gratis CDs with own interpretations conducting or playing)
- Hadjinikos, George: 'The Recitativo in Mozart's Operas', Nefeli Publishing, 2007 (in Greek language)

=== Articles ===
- Hadjinikos, George: 'Nikos Skalkottas, Hellas and Dodecaphony' [Ellas kai Dodekaphonia], contribution to 'A Little Dedication to Nikos Skalkottas's [Mikro Aphieroma ston Niko Skalkota], in Bulletin of Critical Discography [Deltio Kritikis Discographias], 10/13, Athens, 1974, p. 212.
- Hommage to George Hadjinikos

== Sources ==
- Keller, Hans: 'Nikos Skalkottas: An Original Genius', in The Listener, No. 52/134, 9 December 1954, p. 1041
- «Γιώργος Χατζηνίκος – Το βίωμα της μουσικής» (Greek National Television documentary)
