= Líza Fuchsová =

Czech pianist exiled in London (1913–1977)

Líza Fuchsová (31 March 1913 – 27 February 1977) was a Czech concert pianist who settled in England in 1939. She was a long-time duet partner with fellow exile Paul Hamburger.

== Biography ==
Fuchsová was born in Brno, studied at the Brno Conservatory and the Prague Conservatory and performed her debut with the Prague Philharmonic Orchestra at the age of 10, before escaping from Nazi occupied Europe in 1939 to live and work in England. Represented by Ibbs and Tillett, she enjoyed a 30-year performing broadcasting and teaching career, specializing in performances of Czech piano music, particularly Smetana, but also Marko Tajčević, Vilém Tauský, Vítězslav Novák and Zdeněk Fibich. She also performed much piano and chamber music by Antonín Dvořák, and contemporary pieces by Lennox Berkeley, Stephen Heller and Carl Nielsen.

As well as her duet partnership with Paul Hamburger (which lasted from 1954 until 1975) she performed as a member of the Dumka Trio from 1962 until 1972, alongside violinist Suzanne Rosza and cellist Vivian Joseph.

She married the surgeon Ernst Kirz (1909-1971) in 1950 and they lived in Brent, North London, at 4 Gardiner Avenue, NW2. She died in London, aged 63.

== Notable premieres ==
- Walter Gaze Cooper
  - Five Nocturnes (1949)
  - Piano Concerto No. 2, Op. 9 (1961)

Luigi Dallapiccola, Musica per tre pianoforti

- Elisabeth Lutyens, various works, BBC radio, November 1947
- Bohuslav Martinů
  - Concertina for Piano and Orchestra, 30 March 1947
  - Trio for flute, cello and piano, 23 July 1947
  - Piano Concerto, H269, at the Proms, 5 August 1948
  - Sinfonietta Giocosa, June 1950, BBC Home Service
- Karel Reiner. Concerto for piano and orchestra, 1936, Smetana Hall, Prague
