= Sándor Jemnitz =

Hungarian composer

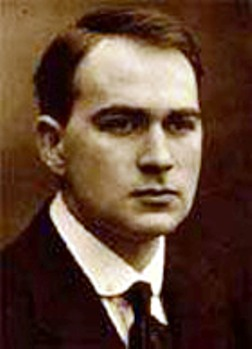
Sándor Jemnitz

Sándor Jemnitz, also known as Alexander Jemnitz (9 August 1890 in Budapest – 8 August 1963 in Balatonföldvár), was a Hungarian composer, conductor, music critic and author.

== Biography ==
Jemnitz studied composition with János Koessler at the Budapest Music Academy from 1906 to 1908, then continued his studies at the Leipzig Conservatory where he studied organ with Karl Straube, violin with Hans Sitt, composition with Max Reger, and conducting with Arthur Nikisch. From 1913 to 1915 Jemnitz lived in Berlin and studied composition with Arnold Schoenberg and began writing articles on music, several of which were published in Die Musik in 1914 and 1915.

Jemnitz returned to Hungary in 1916 and wrote for various newspapers and periodicals. From 1924 to 1950 he was regular music critic of the Népszava newspaper, in which post he established himself as one of the most respected Hungarian critics of the period. Jemnitz taught at the Béla Bartók Conservatory in Budapest from 1951. During his last years, he published several popular books on composers including Felix Mendelssohn, Frédéric Chopin and Wolfgang Amadeus Mozart.

Jemnitz's musical style is heavily influenced by Reger and Schoenberg. His compositions include works for orchestra and keyboard, as well as vocal, choral and chamber music.

== Selected works ==
Stage

- Divertimento, Ballet in 3 scenes (1921, 1947); arrangement of Concerto for Chamber Orchestra

Orchestral

- 7 Miniatures (Hét miniatűr nagyzenekarra) (1919, 1947); partial orchestration of 17 Bagatelles for piano
- Concerto for chamber orchestra, Op. 12 (1921); arranged as the ballet Divertimento
- Prelude and Fugue, Op. 13 (1933)
- Nyitány békeünnepélyre (Overture for a Peace Festival), Op. 58 (1951)
- Concerto for string orchestra, Op. 61 (1954)

Chamber and instrumental music

- String Quartet [No. 1], Op. 2b (1911)
- Quartet for violin, viola, cello and organ, Op. 7 (1918)
- Sonata No. 1 in A minor for violin and piano, Op. 10 (1920)
- Sonata No. 2 in D minor for violin and piano, Op. 14 (1920)
- Sonata in D minor for cello and piano, Op. 17 (1922)
- Sonata No. 1 in A minor for violin solo, Op. 18 (1922)
- Trio for 2 oboes and English horn, Op. 19 No. 1 (1925)
- Trio for flute, violin and viola, Op. 19 No. 2 (1923)
- String Trio, Op. 21 (1924)
- Sonata No. 3 for violin and piano, Op. 22 (1923)
- Serenade for violin, viola and cello, Op. 24 (1927)
- Duo-Sonata for viola and cello, Op. 25 (1927)
- Sonata for flute and piano, Op. 27 (1930–1931)
- Duo-Sonata for saxophone and banjo, Op. 28 (1934)
- Partita for 2 violins, Op. 29 (1932)
- Sonata for cello solo, Op. 31 (1933)
- Trio for violin, viola and guitar, Op. 33 (1932)
- Sonata for harp, Op. 34 (1933)
- Sonata for double bass solo, Op. 36 (1935)
- Sonata No. 2 for violin solo, Op. 37 (1935)
- Sonata for trumpet solo, Op. 39 (1938)
- Quartet for 3 trumpets and bass trumpet, Op. 41a (1925, transcribed 1941)
- Sonata for flute solo, Op. 43 (1938)
- Sonata No. 3 for violin solo, Op. 44 (1938)
- Sonata for viola solo, Op. 46 (1941)
- String Quartet [No. 2], Op. 55 (1950)
- Suite No. 1 for violin and piano, Op. 57 (1952)
- Suite No. 2 for violin and piano, Op. 60 (1953)
- Capriccio for violin and piano, Op. 60b (1953)
- A levél (The Letter) for double bass solo, Op. 69 (1956)
- Trio for flute, oboe and clarinet, Op. 70 (1958)
- Fantasia, Intermezzo, Burla for clarinet and piano, Op. 74 (1965)

Organ

- Introductio, passacaglia e fuga, Op. 1 (1914)
- Sonata per pedale (Organ Pedal Sonata), Op. 42 (1938)
- Sonata No. 1, Op. 68 (1955)
- Sonata No. 2, Op. 72 (1957)

Piano

- Aus der Regerstunde, 3 Pieces, Op. 2a (1915)
- 2 Sonatinas, Op. 4 (1919)
- 17 Bagatelles, Op. 5 (1919); partially orchestrated as 7 Miniatures (1947)
- Sonata No. 1, Op. 8 (1914)
- Fegyvertánc (War Dance) (1921)
- Ornament (1925)
- Sonata No. 2 "Dance Sonata" (Tanzsonate), Op. 23 (1927)
- Sonata No. 3, Op. 26 (1929)
- Sonata No. 4, Op. 30 (1933)
- Recueil, Op. 38 (1938–1945)
- Táncra I (For Dance I), Op. 56 (1950)
- 8 Pieces (1951)
- Táncra II (For Dance II), Op. 65 (1953–1954)
- Sonata No. 5, Op. 64 (1954)
- Ugrós tánc (Leaping Dance) for piano 4-hands (1958)

Vocal

- An einen Boten for voice and piano (published c.1914); words from Des Knaben Wunderhorn
- 9 Lieder for voice and piano, Op. 3; also published as Op. 2
- Schicksal for voice and piano (1919); words by Ludwig Uhland
- 9 Lieder for bass and piano, Op. 6 (published 1920)
- 2 Songs (1922); words by T. Raith
- 5 Uhlandlieder (5 Uhland Songs) for voice and piano, Op. 11 (published 1925); words by Ludwig Uhland
- 11 Lieder for voice and piano, Op. 15
- Három Kassák-dal (3 Kassák Songs) for voice and piano, Op. 50; words by Lajos Kassák
- 6 Songs on Poems of Dezső Kosztolányi (6 Dal) for voice and piano, Op. 62; words by Dezső Kosztolányi

Choral

- 7 Male Choruses (Sieben männerchöre) for male chorus a cappella, Op. 16; words by Ernst Lissauer

Writings

- Bachtól Bartókig (From Bach to Bartók) (1937)
- Szenvedélyek színpadán (On the Stage of Passions) (1943)
- Schumann, a zeneszerző élete leveleiben (Schumann, The Composer's Life in Letters) (1958)
- Felix Mendelssohn Bartholdy (1958)
- Beethoven élete leveleiben (Beethoven's Life in His Letters) (1960)
- Fryderyk Chopin (1960)
- Wolfgang Amadeus Mozart (1961)

== Discography ==
- Jemnitz: Sonata for flute solo – Solos: 20th Century Hungarian Works for Flute; Gergely Ittzés (flute); Hungaroton (1999)
- Jemnitz: Sonata for viola solo – Chamber Music; László Bársony (viola); Hungaroton 31991 (2001)
- Jemnitz: Trio for violin, viola and guitar – Benjamin Hudson (violin); Kim Kashkashian (viola); David Starobin (guitar); A Song from the East, Bridge Classics BDG 9004 (1987); David Starobin Favorite Tracks Vol. 2, Bridge Classics BDG 9292 (2009)

== Sources ==
- Czigány, Gyula (1979). Contemporary Hungarian Composers, 4th Edition, Budapest, Editio Musica, pp. 80–81.
