= Universal Edition =

Austrian classical music publisher

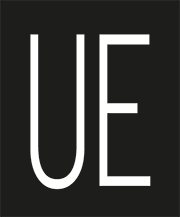
- Founded: 1901; 125 years ago
- Country of origin: Austria
- Headquarters location: Vienna
- Publication types: Sheet music
- Official website: universaledition.com

Universal Edition (UE) is an Austrian classical music publishing firm. Founded in 1901 in Vienna, it originally intended to provide the core classical works and educational works to the Austrian market. The firm soon expanded to become one of the most important publishers of modernist and contemporary classical music.

== History ==
=== 20th century ===
Universal Edition was founded on 1 June 1901 in Vienna. (Note: It was originally founded with a hyphen, "Universal-Edition.) It was formed by the publishers Bernhard Herzmansky (himself from the Doblinger firm), Adolf Robitschek and Josef Weinberger as an attempt to compete with the Leipzig-based publishers Breitkopf & Härtel and Edition Peters. UE itself describes this as an attempt to "simply to counter the predominance of the foreign music trade in Vienna with a domestic music publishing house". In a financial boost for UE, the Austrian Ministry of Education gave a 5 July 1901 decree that Austrian music schools should prefer UE editions over those by German publishers. The firm's creation was announced next month in the Neues Wiener Tagblatt:

"Die neue Musikausgabe, welche unter Zusammenwirken der hervorragendsten Interessenten des österreichisch-ungarischen Musikverlages gegründet wurde, [...] [wird] sowohl die Werke der Classiker wie auch die hervorragendsten Werke instructiver Art umfassen [...], denen sich Schöpfungen bedeutender moderner Meister, [...] anreihen werden."

—Neues Wiener Tagblatt, 9 August 1901, p. 6 (Note: There original newspaper may be seen online: "Page 6". Neues Wiener Tagblatt. Austrian Newspapers Online. (see the middle column))
Translation:

"The new music publisher is a joint venture founded by leading publishers of Austria-Hungary. [...] As well as publishing the classics and significant instructive works, it will also publish compositions by important modern masters ..."

—Translation by Nigel Simeone in Grove

In 1904, UE acquired Aibl publishers, and so acquired the rights to works by Richard Strauss, Max Reger, and other composers. The arrival of Emil Hertzka as managing director in 1907, who remained until his death in 1932, really pushed the firm towards new music. Under Hertzka, UE signed contracts with a number of important contemporary composers, including Béla Bartók and Frederick Delius in 1908; Gustav Mahler, Arnold Schoenberg and Franz Schreker in 1909. Mahler's Symphony No. 8 was the first work UE acquired an original copyright to. Anton Webern and Alexander von Zemlinsky were signed in 1910, Karol Szymanowski in 1912, Leoš Janáček in 1917 and Kurt Weill in 1924. Through their association with Schoenberg, it also published many works by Alban Berg.

The firm's avant garde directions continued after World War II, when UE published works by a number of significant composers, among these Luciano Berio, Pierre Boulez, Morton Feldman, Mauricio Kagel, György Kurtág, György Ligeti and Karlheinz Stockhausen. Later important additions to the catalogue include Harrison Birtwistle, Friedrich Cerha, Georg Friedrich Haas, Cristóbal Halffter, Georges Lentz, Arvo Pärt, Wolfgang Rihm, Michael Jeffrey Shapiro, David Sawer, Gisela Selden-Goth, and Johannes Maria Staud.

UE have also published several significant historical editions, including the complete works of Claudio Monteverdi. In collaboration with Schott, they have published the Wiener Urtext Edition series since 1972. Originally consisting of works for one or two performers by composers from Johann Sebastian Bach to Johannes Brahms, the series was later expanded to include a limited number of later works, such as the Ludus Tonalis of Paul Hindemith.

=== 21st century ===
On 19 October 2007, Universal Edition entered legal proceedings against the International Music Score Library Project (IMSLP), an online entity which seeks to make musical scores in the public domain available digitally. In response to a cease-and-desist letter from Universal Edition demanding that certain scores still covered by Austrian copyright be removed, IMSLP closed itself voluntarily, amidst controversy that UE's demands lacked reasonable legal grounds. While Austrian copyright governs works published up to 70 years after its composer's death, IMSLP is hosted in Canada, where copyright lasts twenty years fewer. The Internet Law professor Michael Geist wrote a column for the BBC, suggesting UE's actions lacked reasonable legal ground. The International Music Score Library maintained that UE's actions lacked legal justification, and reopened on 30 June 2008.
