= List of Greek composers =

This is a list of Greek composers.

== List ==
- Nicolas Astrinidis (1921–2010)
- Athenaios Athenaiou (fl. 138–28 BC)
- Evripides Bekos (born 1991)
- Pavlos Carrer (1829–1896)
- Nikos Christodoulou (born 1959)
- Jani Christou (1926–1970), 20th-century classical and "meta-serialist" composer
- Dinos Constantinides (1929–2021), Greek-American composer
- Dimitris Dragatakis (1914–2001)
- Antiochos Evangelatos (1903–1981), 20th-century composer and conductor
- Yorgos Foudoulis (born 1964)
- Manos Hadjidakis (1925–1994), modern composer best known for Academy Award-winning song, "Never on Sunday", from the film Never on Sunday (1960)
- Christos Hatzis (born 1953)
- George Kallis
- Manolis Kalomiris (1883–1962), composer and founder of Hellenic Conservatory and National Conservatoire
- Eleni Karaindrou (born 1941)
- Panayiotis Kokoras (born 1974), contemporary composer
- Aristotelis Koundouroff (1896–1969), modern composer and musical theorist influenced by Sergei Prokofiev and Russian modernists
- Francisco Leontaritis (1518–1572)
- Dimitrios Levidis (1886–1951)
- Limenios (fl. 128 BC)
- Andreas Makris (1930–2005)
- Nikolaos Mantzaros (1795–1872), Romantic music composer from Corfu
- Yannis Markopoulos (1939–2023), world known for "Who pays the Ferryman" (BBC) and many songs and classical works
- Thanos Mikroutsikos (1947–2019), contemporary composer
- Dimitris Mitropoulos (1896–1960), 20th-century composer and conductor of the New York Philharmonic
- Takis Mousafiris (1936–2021), Greek Aromanian composer and songwriter
- Alexandros Mouzas (born 1962)
- Konstantinos Nikolopoulos (1786–1841)
- Lefteris Papadimitriou
- Giannis Papaioannou (1913–1972)
- Vangelis Papathanassiou (1943–2022), electronic music pioneer, film-score composer, best known for Academy Award-winning score for the film Chariots of Fire (1981), and scores for the films Blade Runner (1982) and 1492: Conquest of Paradise (1992)
- Apostolos Paraskevas (born 1964) contemporary composer and classical guitarist
- Spyros Peristeris (1900–1966) Rebetiko composer
- Harilaos Perpessas (1907–1995), 20th-century composer
- Janus Plousiadenos (~1429–1500), Greek Renaissance composer and hymn writer
- Georgios Poniridis (1892–1982)
- Spyridon Samaras (1861–1917), composer of operas, but widely known as for composition of the song "Olympic Hymn"
- Kyriakos Sfetsas (born 1945)
- Nikos Skalkottas (1904–1949), 20th-century composer
- Georgia Spiropoulos (born 1965), contemporary composer
- Dimitri Terzakis (born 1938), contemporary microtonal composer
- Mikis Theodorakis (1925–2021), classical and film-score composer best known for symphonic works, oratorios and film scores for Zorba the Greek (1964), Serpico (1973) and Z (1969)
- Vassilis Tsabropoulos (born 1966)
- Marios Varvoglis (1885–1967), orchestral, piano and chamber-music composer incorporating a French influence
- Dimitri Voudouris (born 1961), 21st-century classical, new music and electroacoustic composer
- Haris Xanthoudakis (1950-2023)
- Nikos Xanthoulis (born 1962)
- Iannis Xenakis (1922–2001), 20th-century classical, experimental music and mathematical composer
- Spyridon Xyndas (1812–1896)
