= Alexandros Mouzas =

Greek composer

- Born: 1962 (age 63–64)
- Occupation: Composer

Alexandros Mouzas (born 1962) is a Greek composer. He studied composition with Theodore Antoniou, advanced theory with Haris Xanthoudakis and electronic music with Dimitris Kamarotos.

He has composed for various ensembles and has received commissions from organizations and orchestras. He has collaborated with the choreographer Konstantinos Michos and the Lathos Kinissi dance group in many productions, among them Trisha Never Left Home, Days of Vironas, Papageno and Calamity till the Dawn and with Airesis Dance Company.

His professional activities include image-related music. He has written original music for short films, television series, documentaries and commercials for most of the Greek television channels. He was the artistic director of the Greek Section of the European programme New Media Edge Project (2003).

In 2004, he composed under commission by the Athens 2004 Organizing Committee, original music for the Athens Olympic Games corporate videos.

His recent professional activities include production management of various important CD releases of Greek orchestral music. He is the manager and founding member of the Ergon Ensemble.

He runs his own production company, Anax – Cultural Projects. He teaches music technology and film music at top schools in Athens.

Since 1998, he has been a member of the Board of Directors of the Greek Composers’ Union.

NAXOS music label released the CD with orchestral works titled Music for an imaginary film, performed by the Sofia Philharmonic Orchestra.

== Commissions ==
- Megaron, the Athens Concert Hall: film scores for Tusalava (2012) by Len Lye and Film (2012) by Alan Schneider, Asma Asmaton (2008), Struwwelpeter (2004), Trisha Never Left Home (1999)
- The Athens Camerata (the Friends of Music Orchestra): Cam-Media (2009)
- Orchestra of Colors: Stones of Destiny (2010), Giant with the Red Boots (2010), Trisevgeni (2008)
- Alea III, Boston: Monologue (2001)
- Greek National Radio: Prima Materia (1996)

== Works ==
=== Orchestra ===
- InnerScape (2006) for symphony orchestra
- Lucid Dream (2004) for string orchestra
- Thought Forms (2002) for string orchestra
- Monologue (2001/2005) concerto for english horn and orchestra
- Music for an Imaginary Film (1998/2004) for chamber orchestra
- Prima Materia (1996/2005) for orchestra
- Shadows Over the City, (1995) suite for chamber orchestra

=== Chamber music ===
- Handshake Νο III (2009) for marimba and vibraphone
- Handshake Νο ΙΙ (2006) for oboe and clarinet
- On Time (2006) for flute, clarinet, cello, percussion and piano
- Handshake Νο Ι (2002) for flute duet
- Quintet (1997) for woodwinds
- Six Miniatures (1996) string quartet

=== Stage ===
- Stones of Destiny (2010) on text by L. Gaude for actor/narrator, 3 female voices & laptop.
- Trisevgeni (2007) a musical tale for actor/narrator, laptop, synthesizer, flute, clarinet & percussion.
- Struwwelpeter (2004) (text by H.Hoffman, translation by Jenny Mastoraki), for actor/narrator, string orchestra, two clarinets and perc.

=== Multimedia ===
- Cam-Media (2009) for string orchestra, computer and live performance of 25 students using various objects.
- Asma Asmaton (2008) a multimedia production for mezzo-soprano, chamber ensemble, laptop, video and dance. Text from Asma Asmaton (Song of Solomon)

=== Dance ===
- Calamity Till the Dawn (2002)
- Papageno, (2000) digital re-construction of Magic Flute opera
- Trisha Never Left Home, (1999) for orchestra and voices
- Stories of Vironas (1998)

=== Vocal ===
- To Anafilito tis Alithias, (2011) for mezzo soprano and small ensemble
- Animus Errat, (T. Tzara, A. Breton & F. Schouppe)1994) for tenor, horn and piano

=== Solo ===
- Inner Lines (2006) for solo flute
- Ad Lumina, (2002) for solo flute

=== Chorus ===
- Water Music, on text by Ryōkan Taigu (2011) for small ensemble and mixed chorus
- Voices, text by Κ. Cavafy, (1997) for chorus

=== Film ===
- Law of Gravity (Sp.Rasidakis, director) (2001-2002)

=== Television ===
- Tyhero mou asteri (1988, ET2)
- Epikindini Alitheia (1989, ET2)
- Aksiotimoi Kyrioi (1989, ET1)
- Diki- The Trial (1991, ET2)
- Isovitis (1992–93, ET1)
- Episkeptis tis omihlis (1992, MEGA)
- Tris Somatofylakes (1993, ET1)
- Eftyhos dysaresta nea (1994, ET1)
- Skies pano apo tin poli (1994)
- Hara and Gundun (1997, ET1)
- Kai oi pantremenoi ehoun psyhi (1997-2000, ANT1)
- Gia mia thesi ston Helio (1999-2002, MEGA)
- Apagorevmeni Agapi (1998-2001, MEGA)
- Lefkos Ikos (2003, ANT1)
- Erotas me epidotisi OGA (2005, Alpha)

=== Miscellaneous ===
- Music for adv and corporate videos for various companies: Athens Airport, Iaso, Attiki Bank, Skip, Giotis, Kraft, Pampers etc.
- Original music for the Athens Olympic Games corporate videos
