= Beko (disambiguation) =

Beko is a Turkish appliance company.

Beko may also refer to:

- KK Beko, a Serbian basketball club
- 2011 BEKO Super Cup, a basketball tournament
- Besu Sado Beko, an Ethiopian runner
- Fadi Beko, a Syrian footballer

== See also ==
- Bekoe, a Ghanaian surname
- Bekos (disambiguation)
