= Myron Michailidis =

Greek conductor

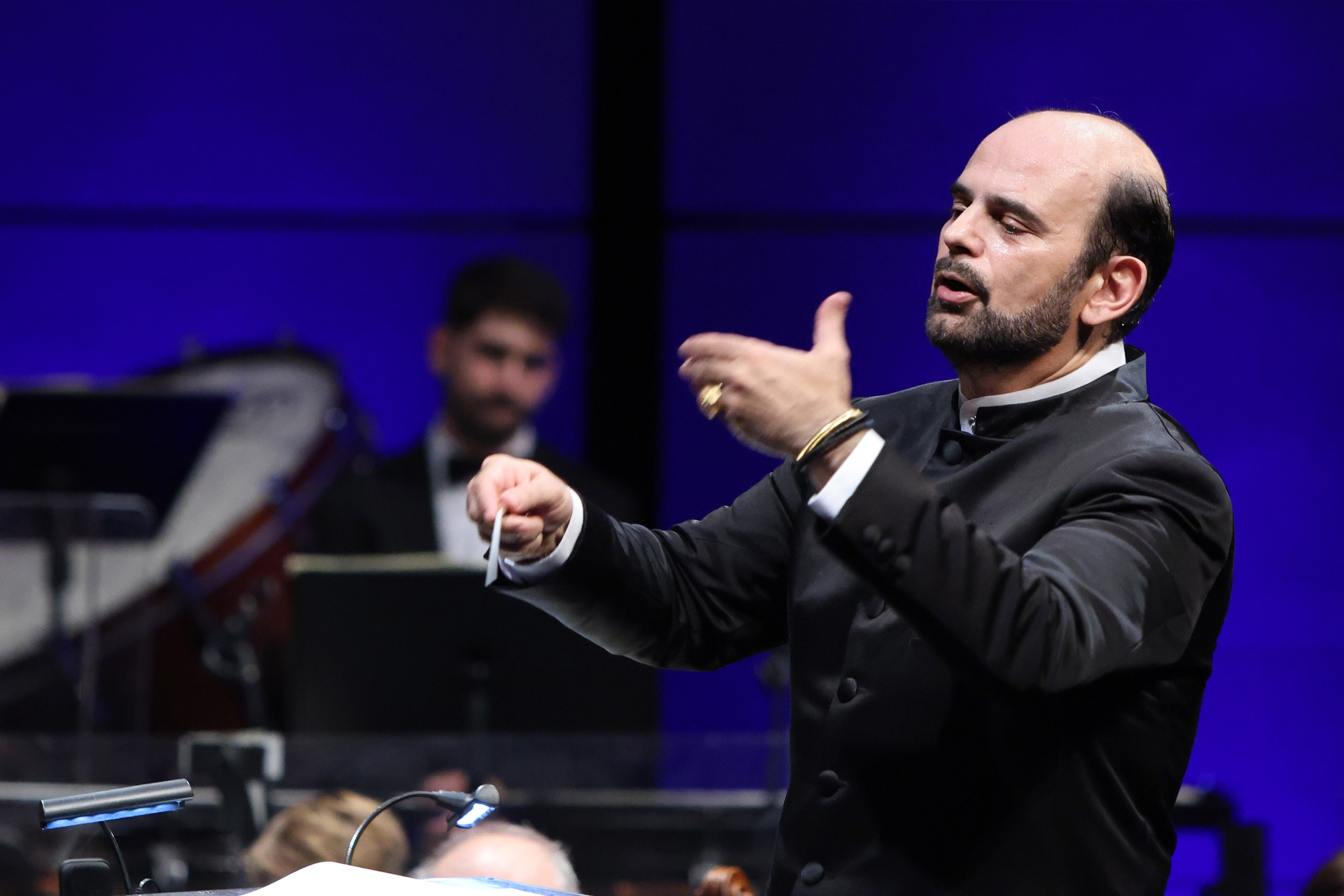
- Michailidis conducting the Athens Philharmonia Orchestra in 2024
- Born: Heraklion, Crete, Greece
- Education: Universität der Künste Berlin (Orchestral Conducting) University of Athens (Law & Economic Sciences)
- Occupations: Conductor; Pianist
- Awards: Chevalier de l'Ordre National des Arts et des Lettres (République Française, 2016)
- Website: www.myronmichailidis.com

Myron Michailidis (Greek: Μύρων Μιχαηλίδης) is a Greek conductor who serves as artistic director of the new Cultural and Conference Center of Heraklion, Crete, Greece since 2019 and the Cyprus Symphony Orchestra since 2026. He is regarded today as one of the most important Greek conductors.

Previously, between 2018 and 2022, Michailidis was the Generalmusikdirektor (GMD) of both the Erfurt Opera & the Philharmonic Orchestra of Erfurt in Germany, and between 2011 and 2017, he held the position of artistic director and principal conductor of the Greek National Opera (GNO) (Greek: Εθνική Λυρική Σκηνή, Ethnikí Lyrikí Skiní) in Athens, Greece, of which he made one of the great European opera houses. From 2004 to 2011 he was the general artistic director and principal conductor of the Thessaloniki State Symphony Orchestra (TSSO), while from 1999 to 2004 he served as permanent conductor at the Opera of Eastern Saxony in Germany.

The repertoire of Myron Michailidis, which consists of a catalog that exceeds 250 symphonic works and 40 operas, ranges from Baroque to Contemporary music and includes Symphonic as well as Choral works alongside operas. He is a great proponent of the music of Beethoven, Tchaikovsky, Rachmaninoff and Xenakis, as well as of the operas of Verdi, Puccini, Gounod and Wagner.

Michailidis has conducted the Berlin Symphony Orchestra, the Philharmonic Orchestra of Erfurt, the Braunschweig State Orchestra, the Saarländisches Staatsorchester, the Vienna Chamber Orchestra, the Camerata München, the Rome Symphony Orchestra, the Shanghai Opera Symphony Orchestra, the Royal Bangkok Symphony Orchestra, the Jerusalem Symphony Orchestra, Sofia Philharmonic Orchestra, the Ontario Philharmonic Orchestra, the Croatian Rijeka National Orchestra, the Slovak Philharmonic Orchestra, the Prague Radio Symphony Orchestra, the Bucharest National Opera, the George Enescu Philharmonic Orchestra, the National Radio Orchestra of Romania, the Orchestra of the National Opera of the Republic of North Macedonia, the Οdessa Philharmonic Orchestra, the Astrakhan State Theater Symphony Orchestra, the Bilkent Symphony Orchestra, the Μexico State Orchestra, the Orquestra Sinfônica Municipal de São Paulo, as well as all Greek symphony orchestras, including the Thessaloniki State Symphony Orchestra, the Athens State Orchestra, the Greek Radio Symphony Orchestra ERT, the Greek National Opera Orchestra and the Athens Philharmonia Orchestra.

He has collaborated with leading artists, including Aldo Ciccolini, Paul Badura-Skoda, Cyprien Katsaris, Ivo Pogorelić, Lars Vogt, Fazıl Say, Barry Douglas, Martino Tirimo, Dimitris Sgouros, Salvatore Accardo, Vadim Repin, Shlomo Mintz, Diana Tishchenko, Kirill Troussov, Mischa Maisky, Theodore Kerkezos, Paata Burchuladze, June Anderson, Cheryl Studer, Aida Garifullina, Maria Farantouri, and several others. About his close collaboration with Myron Michailidis and the Thessaloniki State Symphony Orchestra, the legendary pianist Aldo Ciccolini was declaring in May 2006:

« I am impressed and happy to have collaborated with this orchestra, brilliantly conducted by Mr. Myron Michailidis, who knows what he is doing… a partnership that will remain in my memory for long... »

— Aldo Ciccolini

Also more recently, following a concert conducted by Michailidis in Erfurt in September 2018, Cyprien Katsaris, who played Shostakovich's piano concerto No. 2, declared:

« The Erfurt Philharmonic Orchestra, conducted by the great Greek conductor Myron Michailidis, played wonderfully well [...] it was simply fantastic! Then I listened to Rachmaninoff Symphony No. 2 in the second part, and I could not believe what I witnessed: a miracle! »

— Cyprien Katsaris

== Education ==
Myron Michailidis was born in Heraklion, on the island of Crete in Greece. He studied piano with Dimitris Toufexis in Athens. He continued his musical studies at the Berlin University of the Arts (Hochschule/Universität der Künste, UdK) in Berlin, where he studied conducting with Hans-Martin Rabenstein. He also participated in Master Classes by Miltiades Caridis and Sir Simon Rattle. He holds as well a degree from the Faculty of Law (Department of Law and Economic Sciences) of the University of Athens.

== Career ==
=== Thessaloniki State Symphony Orchestra (2004–2011) ===
The Thessaloniki Concert Hall, residence of the Thessaloniki State Symphony Orchestra.

During his tenure as general artistic director of the Thessaloniki State Symphony Orchestra between 2004 and 2011, Myron Michailidis radically renewed the orchestra's programming and penetrated the international discography. He also conducted numerous concerts at the orchestra's residence, the Thessaloniki Concert Hall and took it to various venues in Greece and abroad, such as the Smetana Hall and Rudolfinum in Prague (2009), the Teatro Verdi in Florence (2009), the Konzerthaus in Berlin (2010) etc. In December 2007, during the celebration events of the Cultural Year of Greece in China, he took the orchestra on tour in Beijing, host of the 2008 Olympic Games, and conducted a historical performance at the Forbidden City Concert Hall.

=== Greek National Opera (2011–2017) ===
Entrance of the Greek National Opera House

In 2011, Myron Michailidis was appointed artistic director of the Greek National Opera (GNO) in Athens. Over his six-year tenure, and in the middle of the Greek economic debt crisis, Michailidis managed to increase both his profile and that of the Opera company, achievements which were both nationally and internationally acclaimed.

Economically, Michailidis successfully restored a balanced budget for the institution, the accumulated debt of €17 million he inherited in 2011 being nearly fully recovered as soon as in 2014. This notable result, achieved during the Greek economic crisis, has been obtained through specific spending cuts (but without dismissal of personnel) and by a substantial policy of public awareness, which significantly raised general and media interest for Lyric Art and increased both tickets sales and filling rates.

Michailidis indeed opened the doors of the Opera to a new audience and developed an array of innovative artistic, cultural, societal and educational activities (which were all presented by the maestro during his emblematic TEDxAcademy2014 talk), such as open rehearsals, musical promenades in the streets of Athens, dance in city squares, open-air free concerts and opera galas in unconventional venues (such as the port of Piraeus for a "waltz of the ferry boats", the Athens International Airport, the metro stations, the popular Varvakeio central market, or the esplanades of the Athens National Archaeological Museum or of the New Acropolis Museum, etc.). Other initiatives included the programs "Suitcase Opera" (operas in miniature form performed in Greek peripheral cities) and "Opera Bus" (double-decker bus on which the singers of the Opera company performed to passers-by in the streets of Athens), the establishment of a "GNO Children’s Chorus" (of about 80 members, which sung for US president Barack Obama at the occasion of his official visit to Athens in 2016) and of a "Young Artists Program", and a participation to the EU outreach program "Interactive Opera for Primary Schools", which concerned 45,000 pupils in 147 schools in Greek regions.

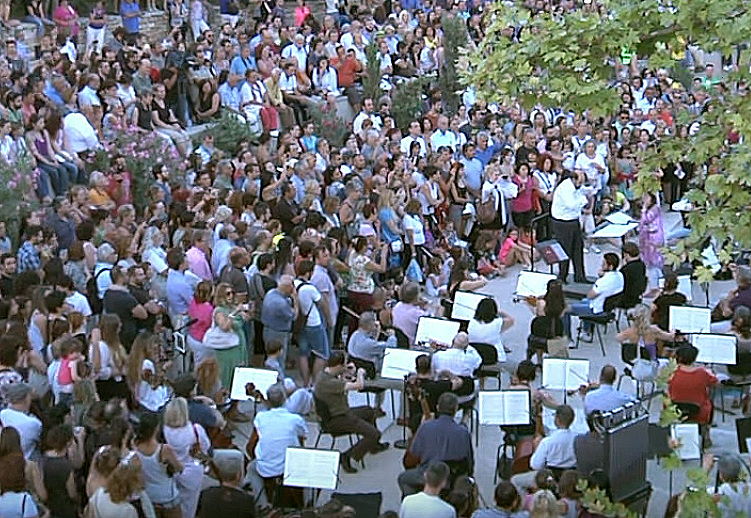
Myron Michailidis conducting the Orchestra of the Greek National Opera under the Acropolis, in an open rehearsal of Puccini's Madame Butterfly (Athens, July 2013).

In parallel, Michailidis developed a framework for international co-productions with large lyrical theaters such as the Royal Opera House of Covent Garden in London, the Welsh National Opera, the Vienna State Opera, the Arena di Verona Festival, the Teatro La Fenice in Venice. He also deepened and extended GNO's relations with other European theaters as a member of the European Forum of Lyrical Theaters, Opera Europa.

Artistically, Michailidis conducted many opera performances within the walls of GNO's historic building (Olympia Theater, 700 seats), in the open-air antic Herodes Atticus Theater (under the Acropolis, 5,000 seats) during the annual summer's Athens Festival and in the two halls of the Megaro Mousikis (Athens Concert Hall, 2,000 & 1,750 seats), with a majority of representations sold out. He conducted Les contes d'Hoffmann (2001), L'elisir d'amore (2002), Fedora (2002), Tosca (2004 & 2012), Il Trovatore (2005), L'italiana in Algeri (2006), La Traviata (2010), Die Zauberflöte (2010 & 2011), Faust (2012), I vespri siciliani (2013), Madama Butterfly (2013), Macbeth (2014), Otello (2014), La Bohème (2015), Tristan und Isolde (2015), Aida (2016) and Lohengrin (2017). GNO's repertoire was significantly increased and proposed 35 new opera and operetta titles, as well as 11 new ballets.

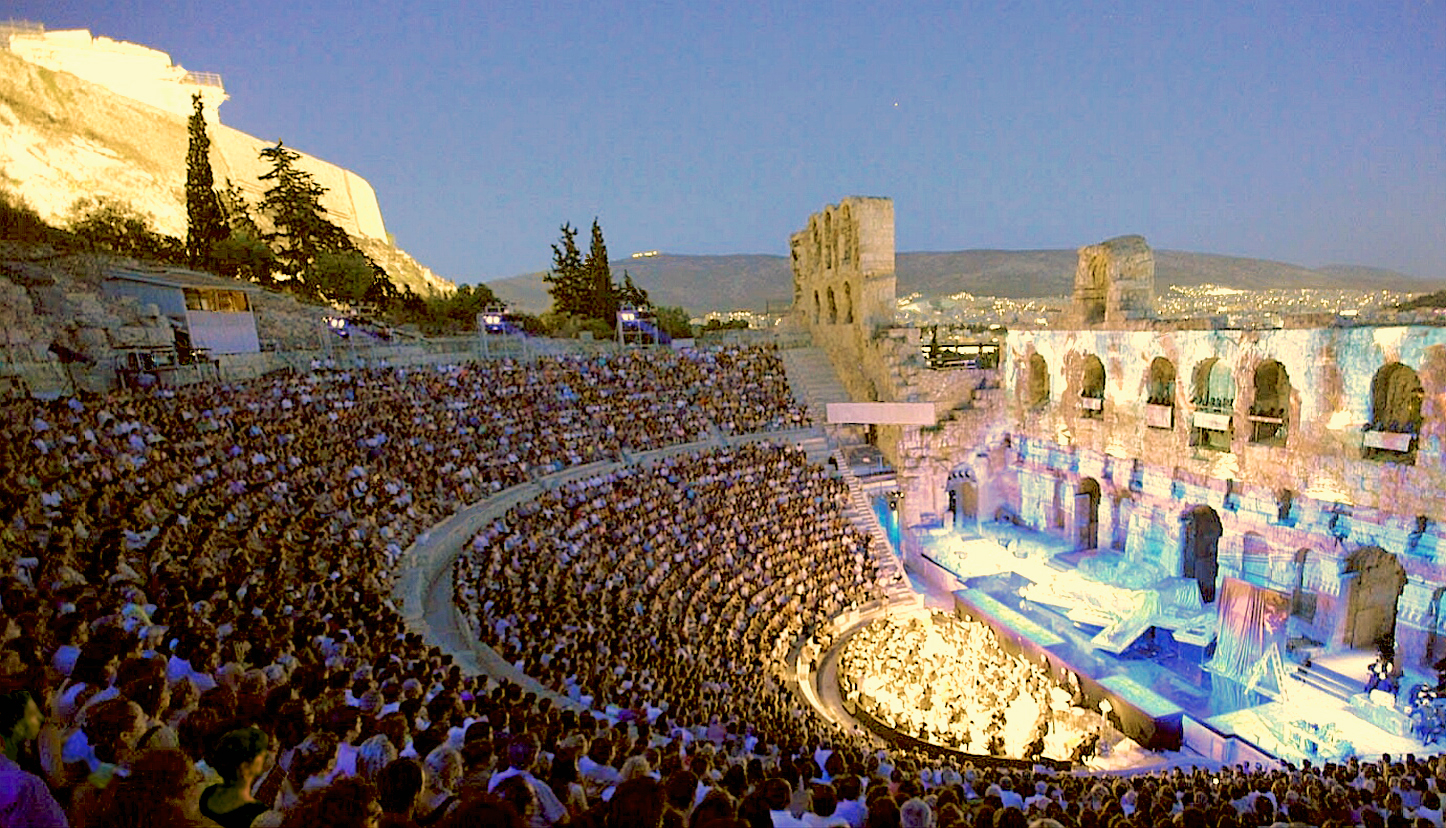
Myron Michailidis conducting the Orchestra of the Greek National Opera in Puccini's Tosca at the Theater of Herodes Atticus under the Acropolis (in 2012)

Michailidis also continued to champion the production of rare works and of contemporary music. Notably, he produced stage performances of contemporary works composed by 6 Greek modern composers, and in 2014, the creation in world's premiere of the contemporary Opera The Murderess (Η Φόνισσα, based on the famous novel by Alexandros Papadiamantis) written by Giorgos Koumendakis, GNO's "composer in residence". Michailidis also conducted the GNO Orchestra & Choir in two novel productions of Richard Wagner's Operas: Tristan und Isolde (2015, staged by Yiannis Kokkos) and Lohengrin (2017, staged by Anthony McDonald), which were both heard for the first time in Greek history, in their integral, original and scenic versions.

The Greek National Opera House in the Stavros Niarchos Foundation Cultural Center (SNFCC) newly built by architect Renzo Piano (2017)

One of Michailidis' long-term achievements was the relocation of the GNO in 2017 from its former venue, the historic Olympia Theater located in the center of Athens; to its newly built headquarters in the Stavros Niarchos Foundation Cultural Center (SNFCC), a performing arts center designed by architect Renzo Piano. The center includes new facilities for the National Library of Greece (NLG) and for the Greek National Opera (GNO) (new 1,400-seat Opera Hall), located in a 210,000 m² park nearby Athens center, in Palaio Faliro, on the Athens riviera. Notably, in 2014, before the move, Michailidis conducted a live performance of the GNO orchestra on the construction site of the SNFCC, during which 10 tower cranes “danced” to the music of Gustav Holst's The Planets, with Renato Zanella's unique choreography.

=== Theater Erfurt & Erfurt Philharmonic Orchestra (2018–2022) ===
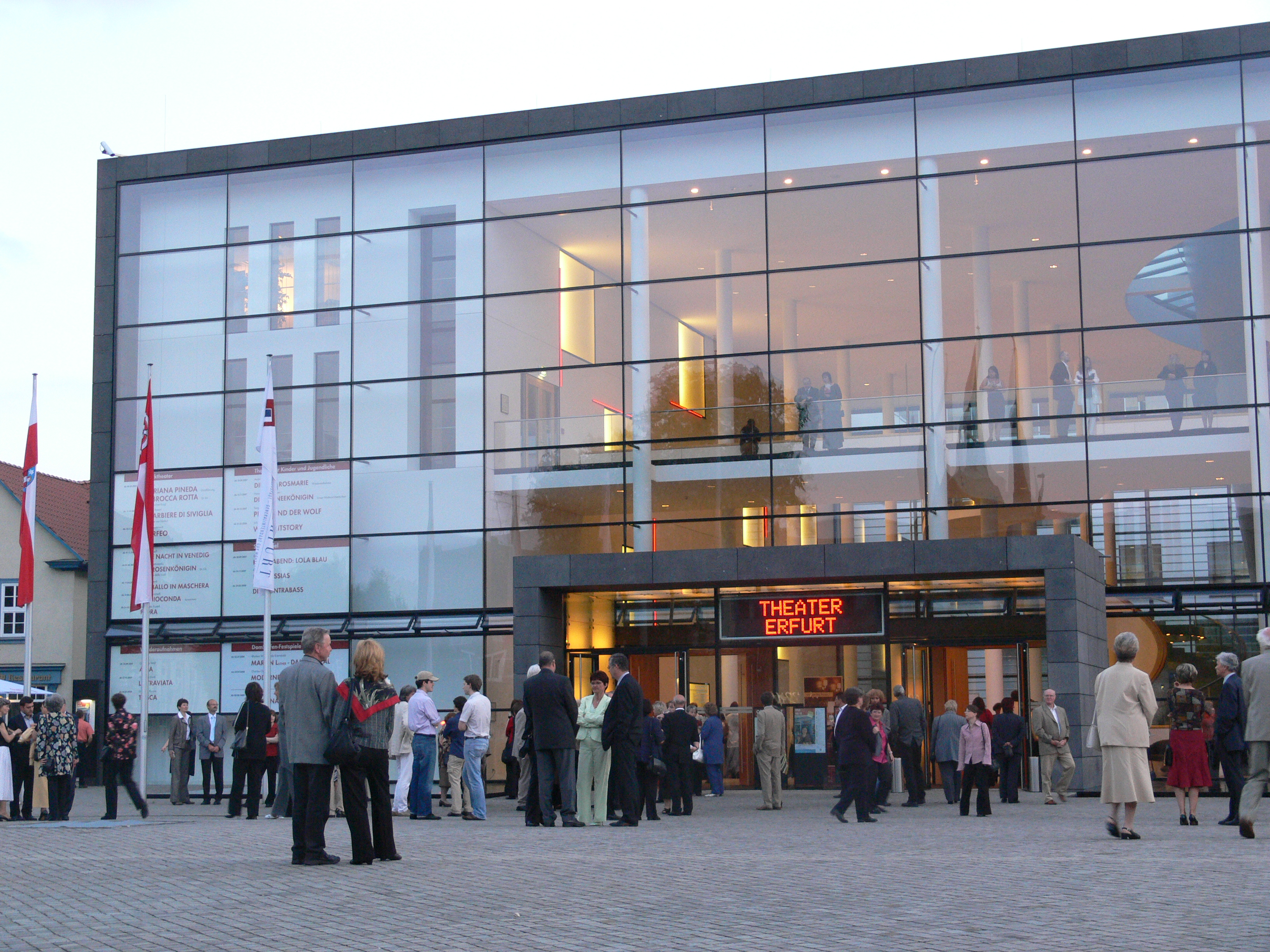
New Opera House of the Theater Erfurt (Großes Haus)

After completing two mandates at the GNO, and a few months only before GNO's final installation in the SNFCC, the Greek Ministry of Culture announced to the general surprise in February 2017 that Michailidis contract will not be extend beyond that season, provoking a great shock in public opinion. Following his invitation at the Opera House of Shanghai to conduct Donizetti's La Fille du régiment (for its first presentation on Chinese soil) and at the Theater Erfurt to conduct the rare Giulietta e Romeo of Riccardo Zandonai, it was announced, late 2017, that Michailidis was chosen by the direction of the Theater Erfurt and by the members the Erfurt Philharmonic Orchestra to become their new Generalmusikdirektor (GMD) for the next two seasons.

For his 2018/19 season debut, Michailidis conducted a new production of Bizet's Carmen at the 2018 Erfurt summer's open-air festival, DomStufen-Festspiele (which takes place on the Cathedral Square, seating up to 2,000 spectators). He also conducted for the following seasons Lehár's Die Lustige Witwe (2019), Rimsky-Korsakov's The Tale of Tsar Saltan (2019), Verdi's Aida (2019), Nabucco (2020, 2022) and Luisa Miller (2022), Wagner's Lohengrin (2020) and Puccini's Manon Lescaut (2021), as well as a series of symphonic works of Mozart, Beethoven, Schumann, Brahms, Mahler, Strauss, Tchaikovsky, Rimsky-Korsakov, Rachmaninoff, Prokofiev, Kabalevsky, Berlioz, Massenet, Debussy, Dutilleux, Skalkottas and Theodorakis. On 3 December 2022, Michailidis also conducted the world premiere's creation of Eleni, a contemporary opera based on Nicholas Gage's homonymous best-selling book, written by Australian-Greek composer Nestor Taylor (libretto Fergus Currie) and staged by Theater Erfurt's director Guy Montavon. Michailidis was conducting the Philharmonisches Orchester Erfurt either in the new Opera House of the Erfurt Theater (Großes Haus, 840 seats) or in several other Thuringian venues, such as the historic "Festsaal" of the Wartburg castle.

=== Cultural and Conference Center of Crete (2019–) ===
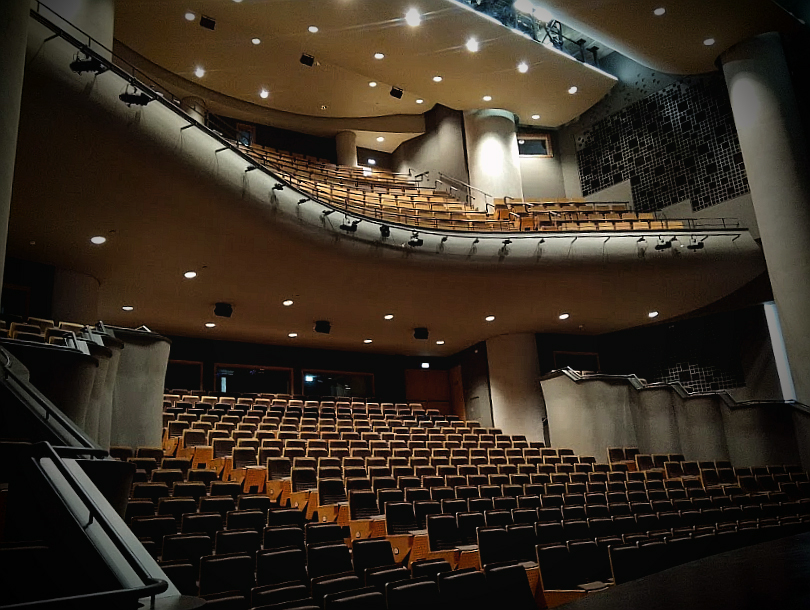
Main Hall of the new Cultural and Conference Center of Crete, in Heraklion (2019).

In February 2019, Myron Michailidis has been appointed as the first artistic director of the newly built Cultural and Conference Center of Crete (CCCC), in Heraklion, Greece, a position he initially held in parallel to his position of Generalmusikdirektor (GMD) at the Theater Erfurt. For its historical inaugural concert, Michailidis has conducted the Greek Radio Symphony Orchestra ERT in works of Markopoulos, Theodorakis, Rossini, Massenet and Tchaikovsky, all inspired by the Cretan or Mediterranean tradition.

Within just a few years of operation, Myron Michailidis transformed the CCCC into a leading cultural destination with a regular, institutional opera programme, establishing it as Greece's second most significant lyric institution (after the Greek National Opera) and the foremost in the regions.

Michailidis pursues his collaborations in Crete with internationally acclaimed artists, including Cyprien Katsaris, Diana Tishchenko, Andonis Foniadakis (choreographer of the contemporary ballet Burning Water) and Maria Farantouri. In November 2023, he accompanies the Greek diva at the piano for a unique recital featuring works by composers Manos Hadjidakis and Mikis Theodorakis, and, in November 2025, with the Athens State Orchestra for the official celebration of the 100 years from Mikis Theodorakis's birth.

In November 2021, he produced in collaboration with the Teatro Grattacielo of New York and conducted Mozart's Idomeneo, the first opera performance in full stage and music form ever given in Crete. It was also the first time since its creation that Mozart's Opera, whose libretto sets the action in Crete, was given on the island. For the following seasons, several new productions were presented in Crete for the first time in fully staged and complete musical form, all under the baton of Michailidis (most often conducting the Athens Philharmonia Orchestra): Verdi's Otello (2022), Rigoletto (2023) and Nabucco (2026), Bizet's Carmen (2023), Donizetti's L'elisir d'amore (2024), Mascagni’s Cavalleria rusticana (2024), Leoncavallo's Pagliacci (2025), Puccini’s Tosca (2025), and Madama Butterfly (2027)

Through these productions, Michailidis established an international network of artistic collaborations, bringing partnerships with established institutions and festivals in Europe and the United States to Greece. The co-productions connected the Cretan operatic scene with the Rijeka Croatian National Theatre, the Teatro Grattacielo of New York, the Mascagni Festival of Livorno, the Teatro Politeama Greco and the Provincia di Lecce, and the Ljubljana Slovene National Theatre Opera and Ballet, strengthening Crete's ties with leading opera houses and festivals abroad.

In February 2023, Michailidis has also triumphed at the CCCC in the world premiere's creation Eleftherios Venizelos, a contemporary opera based on the life of the Greek prominent statesman Eleftherios Venizelos written by Greek composer Dimitris Maramis and staged by Theater Erfurt's director Guy Montavon.

During summer 2023, Michailidis conducted Karl Orff's Carmina Burana in the hall of the CCCC and then at the open-air festival of Giortes Rokkas, Crete an event that took place within the archaeological site of Rokka and in front of an audience of more than 5,000 people. In November 2024, as part of the celebrations marking the 200th anniversary Beethoven’s Symphony No. 9 in D minor, Op. 125, Michailidis conducted the composer's emblematic masterpiece in a historic concert, presenting the work for the very first time in Crete.

=== Cyprus Symphony Orchestra (2026–) ===
In December 2025, The Cyprus Symphony Orchestra Foundation announces the official appointment of Myron Michailidis as artistic director of the Cyprus Symphony Orchestra, with his term beginning in January 2026.

== Recordings ==
Michailidis has recorded for EMI Classics and repeatedly for Naxos, as well as for numerous Greek labels and for the Greek National Radio:

- In 2007, his first recording for Naxos Greek Classics – Impressions For Saxophone And Orchestra, featuring works by contemporary Greek composers such as Mikis Theodorakis, Nikos Skalkottas, Theodore Antoniou, Manos Hadjidakis, Minas Alexiadis and Vassilis Tenidis, and interpreted by the saxophone virtuoso Theodore Kerkezos and the TSSO orchestra conducted by Michailidis, received the Supersonic Award by the magazine Pizzicato Classics in Luxembourg and was recommended by Naxos for two Grammy Awards.
- In 2009, his recording of works of the important Italian composer Ildebrando Pizzetti for Naxos (some of them being World Premiere Recordings) received several distinctions (Honorable Award from the Greek Critics Association for Music and Theater in December 2009) and many very positive reviews in the international press (including Five Diapasons attributed by the French magazine Diapason).
- Notably, in 2012, his recording for EMI Classics of Beethoven's piano concertos Nos 3 & 4 with the TSSO and the legendary French pianist Aldo Ciccolini received international acclaim.
- In 2015, Michailidis released the first DVD ever produced by the Greek National Opera, Gounod's Faust, featuring Eric Cutler (Faust), Alexia Voulgaridou (Marguerite), Paata Burchuladze (Méphistophélès), Dimitri Platanias (Valentin), Renato Zanella (Director – Choreographer), Myron Michailidis (Conductor) – GNO Orchestra, Chorus and Ballet. Recorded and filmed on January 20, 2012, at the Athens Concert Hall, under the direction of Michalis Dais.

== Awards ==
- In 2009, Myron Michailidis received the Honorable Award from the Greek Critics Association for Music and Theater.
- In 2016, he was made Chevalier de l'Ordre National des Arts et des Lettres (Knight of the National Order the Arts and Letters) of the French Republic.
- In 2017, he received the prestigious Award Apollo from the Society of Friends of the Greek National Opera (GNO) for his entire contribution to the successes and achievements of the institution.
