= Byron Fidetzis =

Greek cellist and conductor

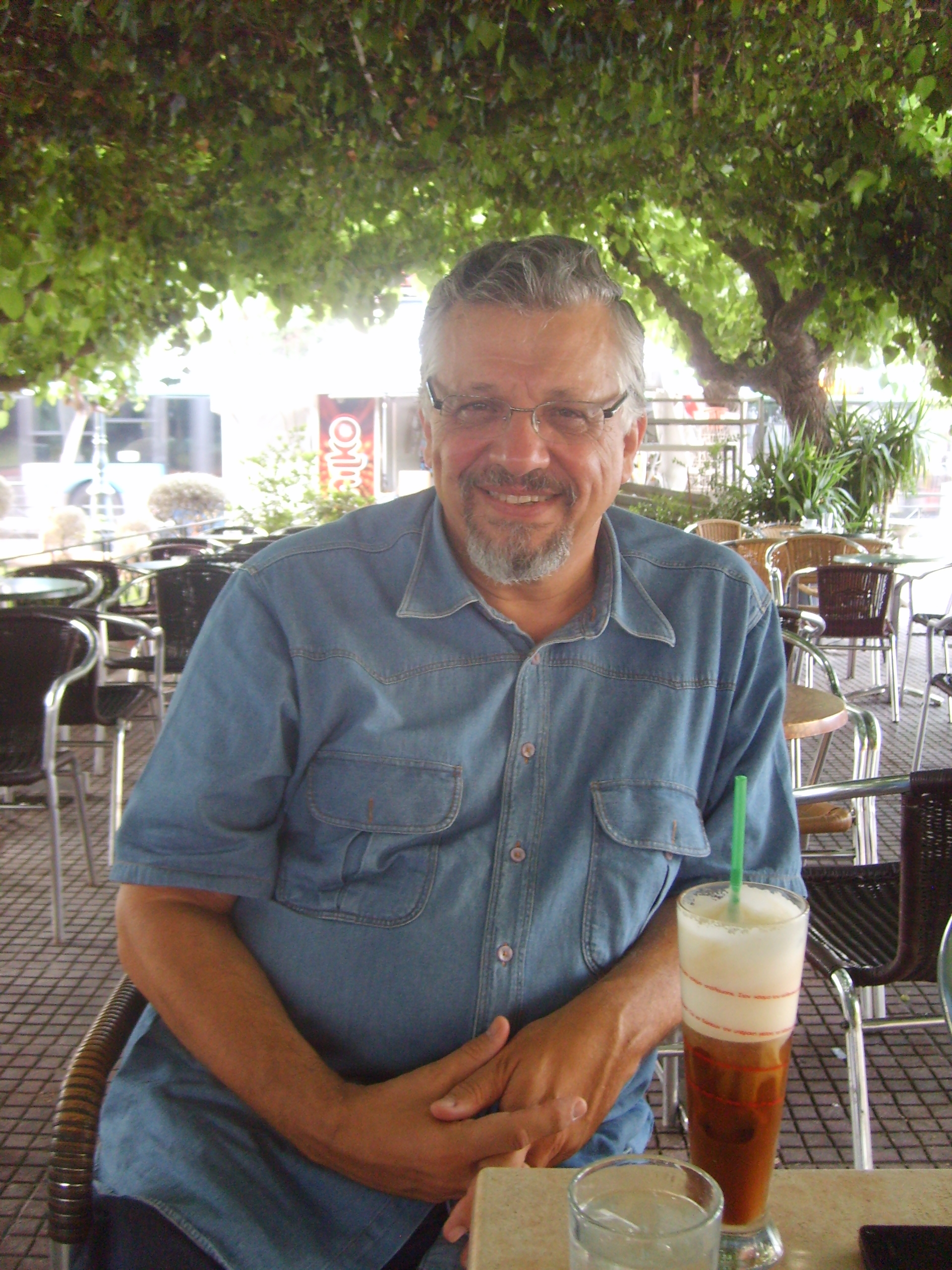
Byron Fidetzis

Byron Fidetzis (Greek: Βύρων Φιδετζής) is a Greek cellist and conductor, who has been a major figure for decades in the musical life of his native Greece. He has championed Greek classical music and has premiered a wide range of works.

== Early studies ==
Byron Fidetzis was born in Thessaloniki in 1945, He studied violoncello under Manolis Kazabakas and advanced theory under Solon Michaelides at the State Conservatory of Thessaloniki. With a scholarship granted by the Hellenic Foundation for State Bursaries, he moved to Vienna, where he continued with his cello studies at the Hochschule für Musik under the expert guidance of Vladimir Orloff and André Navarra, earning his diploma in 1975.

Alongside his cello studies, he attended the class of Hans Swarowsky in orchestra conduction from 1973 to 1977, in which year he gained his diploma at chef d’ orchestre. He has also attended seminars held by conductors Miltiades Caridis (Vienna) and Otmar Suitner (Weimar).

== Recordings ==
Fidetzis has recorded:

- Spyridon Samaras’s operas Rhea, La Martire, La Biondinetta (or, Historie d’Amour), Mademoiselle de Belle-Isle;
- Pavlos Carrer’s operas Frossini and Despo o L’eroina di Suli;
- Dimitri Mitropoulos's opera Sœur Béatrice;
- All three Manolis Kalomiris’s symphonies, namely the Levendia Symphony (of Manliness), Of Simple and Good People and "Palamian" as well as the composer’s operas Anatoli (Sunrise) and Konstantinos Paleologos (The Fall of Constantinople);
- Yoannis Constantinidis’s complete orchestral works; and
- Nikolaos Mantzaros’s Ode to Freedom in its original, conclusive form.

He recorded works by such notable composers as Dimitris Dragatakis, Antiochos Evanghelatos, Demetrios Lialios, Marios Varvoglis, Emilios Riadis, Theodore Antoniou, Mikis Theodorakis, Haris Xanthoudakis, and many others. In 1990, he did the world premiere recording of the symphonic cycle of the 36 Greek dances. On January 28, 1997, he conducted the Athens State Orchestra in the public world premiere of the whole cycle in Thessaloniki. For all the above he had to restore the musical texts, considering all of the composer’s accessible scores. He has also corrected masses of mistakes in printed scores and in scores recorded in PC. In 2020, he also released an album of music by composer Vasily Kalafati on Naxos.

== Awards and honors ==
In 1975, the Athens Academy presented him with the Spyros Motsenigos Music Award; he has also received awards by the Bank of Greece and the International Fair of Thessaloniki.

The Greek Composers Association has duly acknowledged his contribution to Greek music, unanimously electing him Honorary Member in 1986. Byron Fidetzis has also received distinctions by the Union of Drama and Music Greek Critics for his recording output.

In 2010, the Department of Music Studies of the National and Kapodistrian University of Athens presented him with an Honorary Doctorate.

== Sources ==
- Ζακυθηνός, Αλέξης [Zakythinos, Alexis], Δισκογραφία ελληνικής κλασικής μουσικής, Athens-Janina, Dodoni (Δωδώνη), 1993.
