= Daniil Alekseenko =

Opera singer (born 1977)

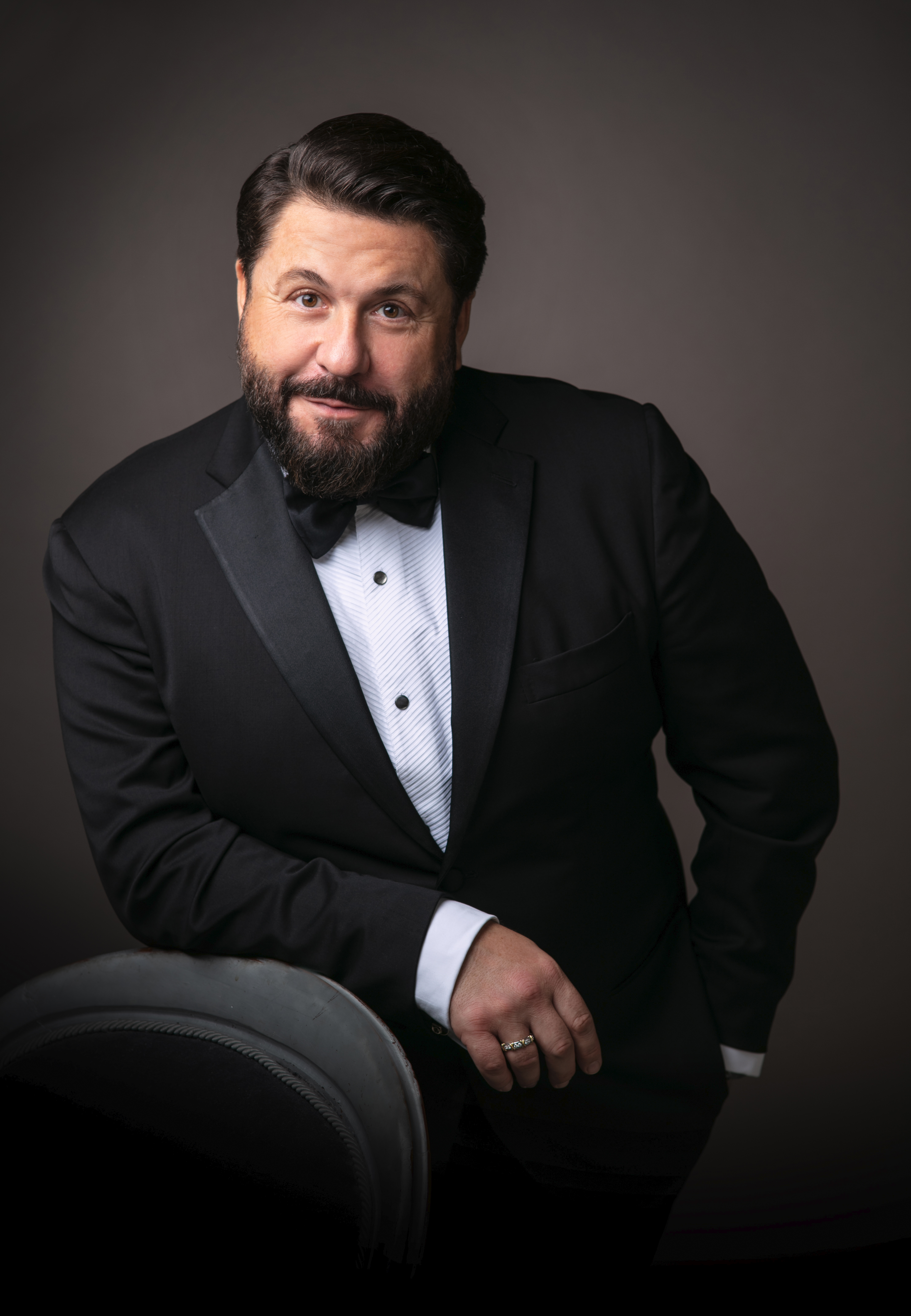
- Daniil Alekseenko
- Born: December 2, 1977 (age 47); Vladivostok, Soviet Union
- Occupation: Opera singer (baritone)

Daniil Alekseenko (born 2 December 1977) is an opera singer (baritone).

== Early life and education ==
Alekseenko was born in Vladivostok. He graduated in 1992 from the Moscow Gnessin School of Music, in 1997 from the Academic Music College at the Moscow Conservatory, and in 2002 from the Moscow Conservatory, French horn class. In 2006 he graduated from the Moscow Conservatory in the class of opera singing.

After graduation, he moved to the United States, where he later received citizenship.

== Career ==
He performs the leading parts of the baritone repertoire on the stages of various opera houses in the US and Europe.

Alekseenko is the winner of several international vocal competitions, a participant in the international festivals Black Eyes (Italy), Miami Classical Music Festival (USA), Cantofest (Portugal), Immling Festival (Germany) and others.

In 2017, he performed at the award ceremony of the Elena Obraztsova Foundation.

In 2020–2021 he was a guest performer at the Novaya Opera Theatre.

In 2022, he made his debut as Iago in the opera Otello at the Ivan Zajc Croatian National Theatre in Rijeka. Then he performed the same part in the Cultural and Conference Center of Heraklion in Greece.

== Repertoire ==
- Otello (Iago)
- Il pirata (Ernesto)
- The Marriage of Figaro (Figaro, Bartolo)
- Gianni Schicchi (Gianni Schicchi)
- La bohème (Alcindoro)
- Madama Butterfly (Sharpless)
- The Tales of Hoffmann (Lindorf, Coppelius, Dappertutto, Miracle)
- The Magic Flute (Sarastro)
- Prince Igor (Prince Igor)
- The Tsar's Bride (Grigory Gryaznoy)
- Salome (First Nazarene)
- Tosca (Baron Scarpia)
- Witch (Postman)
- I puritani
- Carmen

== Reviews ==
Lawrence Budmen on Alekseenko's performance as Figaro at the Miami Music Festival: “Danil Alekseenko dominated the stage as Figaro. Every inch the factotum and schemer, Alekseenko’s bass-baritone has the depth and power for the role’s lowest notes. His booming sound can also turn suave and mellow. Figaro’s Act IV aria “Aprite un po’quegli occhi” was sung with subtlety, more inward reflection than vocal showpiece. His chemistry and rapport with the Susanna of Sara Law was a particular delight throughout the performance.”

Helena Labus Bačić on Alekseenko's performance of the role of Iago at the Croatian National Ivan Zajc Theatre: “Daniil Alekseenko was a diabolical Iago, interpreting "Credo" with great participation. Possessing a powerful velvety voice, he effectively posed as someone who is fully aware of the evil he is doing, but absolutely devoid of any remorse.”

== Awards ==
- 2007: Semi-finalist of the International Tchaikovsky Competition
- 2017: Verdi Medal from the government of Montecatini Terme, Italy
