= Xanthoudakis =

Xanthoudakis is a surname. Notable people with the surname include:

- Elena Xanthoudakis (born 1978), Australian operatic soprano
- Haris Xanthoudakis (1950–2023), Greek composer
