= Bekos =

Bekos may refer to:

- Bikus, a village in West Azerbaijan, Iran.
- Evripides Bekos, born 1991, Greek musician and composer.
- The Phrygian word for bread, reported by Herodotus as the first word of an infant in a Language deprivation experiment

== See also ==
- Beko (disambiguation)
