= Lina Mendoni =

Greek politician (born 1960)

- Λίνα Μενδώνη
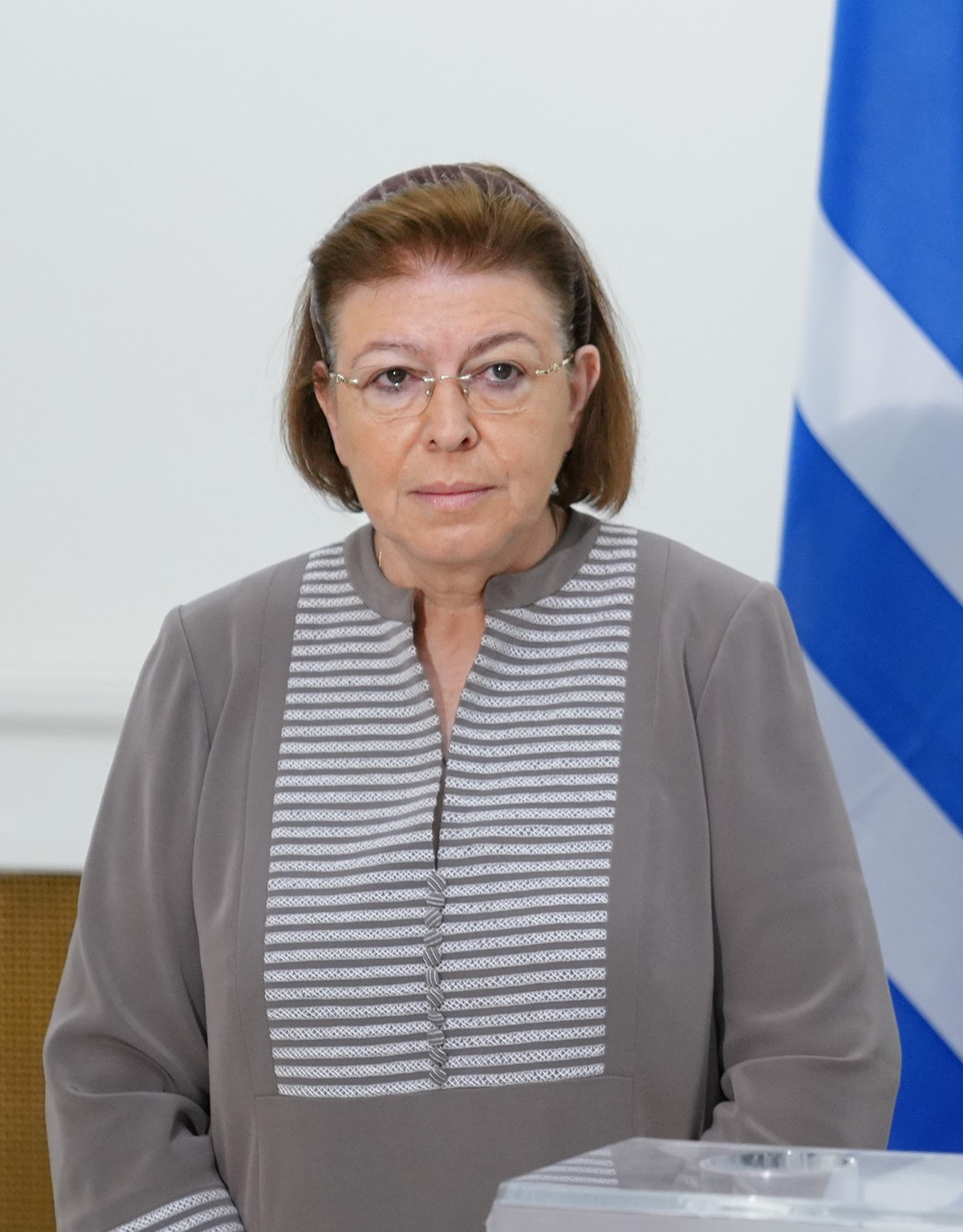
- Mendoni in 2020

Minister of Culture
- Incumbent
- Assumed office 27 June 2023
- Prime Minister: Kyriakos Mitsotakis
- Preceded by: position established

Minister of Culture and Sports
- In office 9 July 2019 – 26 May 2023
- Prime Minister: Kyriakos Mitsotakis
- Preceded by: Myrsini Zorba
- Succeeded by: Giorgos Koumendakis (caretaker)

Secretary-General of the Ministry of Culture
- In office 2009–2015
- Appointed by: Antonis Samaras
- In office 1999–2004
- Appointed by: Elisavet Papazoi

Personal details
- Born: 1 April 1960 (age 66) Athens, Kingdom of Greece
- Party: Independent (2019–present)
- Other political affiliations: PASOK (until 2019)
- Spouse: Panagiotis Doukellis
- Children: 1
- Education: National and Kapodistrian University of Athens
- Occupation: Archeologist • Politician

Lina Mendoni (Greek: Λίνα Μενδώνη; born 1 April 1960) is a Greek politician who has been serving as Minister of Culture of Greece since 2023, having previously served as Minister of Culture and Sports from 2019 to 2023, in the first and second cabinets of Kyriakos Mitsotakis.

She holds a PhD in archaeology from the National and Kapodistrian University of Athens.
