= Christos Stasinopoulos =

Greek singer and actor

- Χρήστος Στασινόπουλος
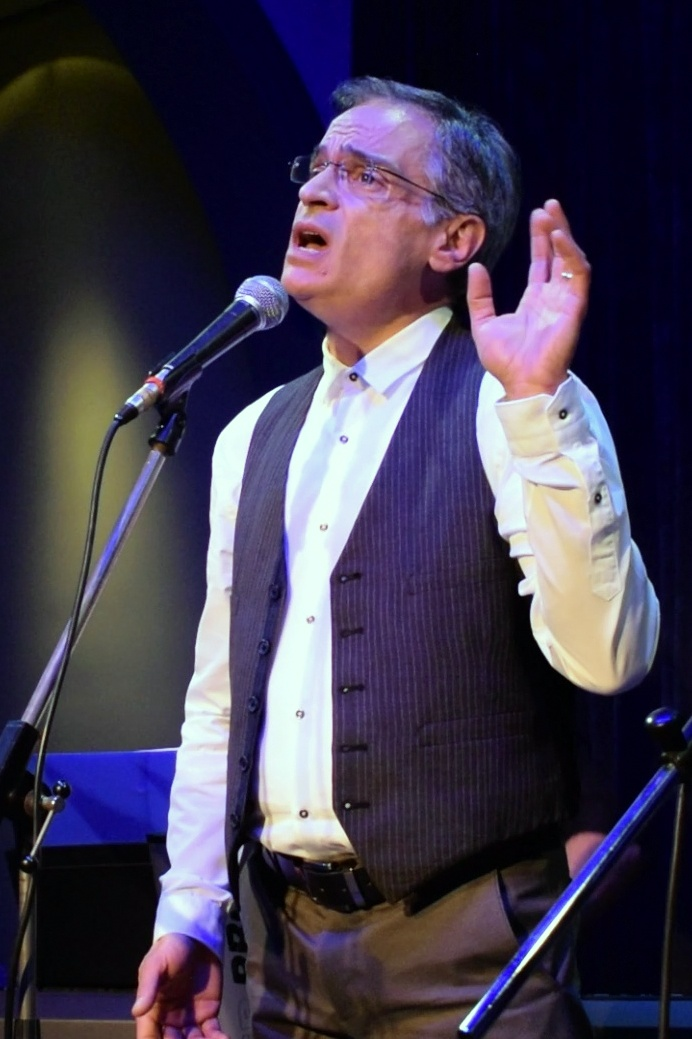
- Christos Stasinopoulos on concert in Athens, March 31, 2017
- Born: Athens
- Notable work: Disney voice actor
- Website: https://www.christos-stasinopoulos.com

Christos Stasinopoulos (or Stassinopoulos; Greek: Χρήστος Στασινόπουλος) is a Greek tenor and actor from Athens.

== Education ==
Christos Stasinopoulos studied acting at the Drama Schools of Piraeus Association and Evgenia Hatzikou's in Athens.

He started his opera studies at the National Greek Conservatory with Georgia Georgilopoulou, continued in Stockholm with the soprano Ulla Blom and completed at the Hellenic Conservatory in Athens with the tenor Paulos Raptis. He graduated summa cum laude, being also awarded an excellence prize. Moreover, he studied advanced music theory and harmony at the Hellenic Conservatory, graduating with distinction. He also studied oratorio, art song and chamber music interpretation in master classes with Paul von Schilawsky, the eminent pianist and pedagogue of the Mozarteum University Salzburg.

== Acting career ==
He made his acting debut as Puck in W. Shakespeare's "A Midsummer Night's Dream" with the Seventh Theatre Company. From then on he joined other groups and participated in several television and radio productions. However he soon focused on his singing career. He starred in Lefteris Chrysochoos's shortfilm "Heralds of the Chimera", that participated in the International Shortfilm Festival hosted in Drama, Greece and the Munich International Festival of Film Schools.

He became a well-known voice artist after he had been chosen by the Walt Disney Company to perform the title-part in "Aladdin", in the dubbed Greek version of the animated film, as well as in its two sequels "The Return of Jafar" and "Aladdin and the King of Thieves". He's been also the Greek voice of "Aladdin" in the long running TV series. Besides "Aladdin", he has dubbed the parts of Tweedle Dee and Tweedle Dum in Walt Disney's "Alice in Wonderland".

Warner Bros. chose him to perform the part of Cornelius in the Greek version of Don Bluth's animated film "Thumbelina" and the part of Hubbie in "The Pebble and the Penguin".

== Singing career ==
Mainly a concert singer, with a wide repertoire ranging from the Renaissance to contemporary music and musical theatre, he has given numerous recitals and participated in concerts in Greece and Sweden. He has appeared at the Athens Festival, the Greek National Opera and the Athens Concert Hall among others.

In 1997 he was praised for his opera debut as the Vizier in Nikos Mamangakis's "Opera of Shadows", commissioned and produced by Megaron, the Athens Concert Hall. In 2008 his performances as the Soldier in Viktor Ullmann's opera "The Emperor of Atlantis" (Der Kaiser von Atlantis) and in Dimitri Sykias's "Orpheus: a chamber symphony with acting voices" at the Experimental Stage of the Greek National Opera received memorable reviews.

== Discography ==
- The Nightingale of the Emperor, an opera for children based on H. C. Andersen's fairy-tale

Music by Lena Platonos, adaptation - libretto - lyrics by Yorgos Voloudakis. Soloists: Aris Christofellis, Spyros Sakkas, Franghiskos Voutsinos, Savina Yannatou, Yannis Samsiaris, Christos Stasinopoulos (LYRA Records)
