= Yannos Margaziotis =

Yannos Margaziotis (born 1967) is a Greek violinist with a career as a soloist with several major orchestras and ensembles including the Greek National Opera Orchestra, the Athens State Orchestra, the Royal Danish Orchestra, and the Orchestra of Contemporary Music of the Hellenic Broadcasting Corporation. He artistic director of the International Classical Music Festival of Cyclades on Syros and is one of the founding members of the Artis piano trio, which has performed at New York's Weill Recital Hall (part of Carnegie Hall)., and the Athens Festival. He also teaches Chamber Music at the Athens Conservatory.

Margaziotis was born in Athens had his first music lessons from his grandfather, Ioannis Margaziotis. He then studied with Mihalis Semsis, and after receiving a scholarship from the Onassis Foundation, completed his studies Music Academy of Utrecht. He received his Master's Degree in chamber music from the Royal Conservatory of The Hague where he studied under Vladimir Mendelssohn.

== Sources ==
- International Classical Music Festival of Cyclades 2010, Biography of Yannos Margaziotis
- Eleftherotypia, "Σοσιαλιστικός ρεαλισμός και θρησκευτικός σουρεαλισμός" ("Socialist realism and religious surrealism") 26 August 2009 (in Greek)
