= Stasinopoulos =

Stasinopoulos or Stassinopoulos (Greek: Στασινόπουλος), feminine form Stasinopoulou (Στασινοπούλου), is a Greek surname. It can refer to:

- Arianna Stassinopoulou, birth name of Arianna Huffington (born 1950), Greek-American author and founder of The Huffington Post
- Christos Stassinopoulos, Greek opera singer, recitalist and actor
- Michail Stasinopoulos (1903–2002), Greek jurist and President of Greece
