= Cultural and Conference Center of Heraklion =

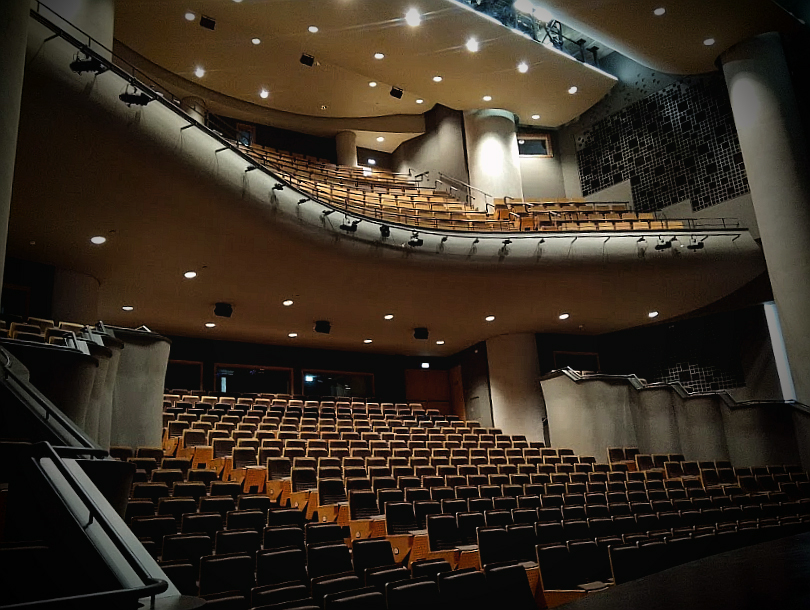
- View of the main Hall
- Interactive map of the Cultural and Conference Center of Heraklion area
- Alternative names: Cultural and Conference Center of Crete

General information
- Location: Nikolaou Plastira Avenue, Heraklion, Greece
- Coordinates: 35°20′01.0″N 25°07′48.0″E
- Inaugurated: 8 March 2019
- Cost: € 55 million

Design and construction
- Architect: Tasos Biris

Other information
- Seating capacity: 750 (main stage)

Website
- https://www.cccc.gr/en

Cultural and Conference Center of Heraklion (Greek: Πολιτιστικό και Συνεδριακό Κέντρο Ηρακλείου, ΠΣΚΗ), also Cultural and Conference Center of Crete (Πολιτιστικό και Συνεδριακό Κέντρο Κρήτης), is a centre for the performing arts in Heraklion, Greece. It was inaugurated in 2019 after long debates and planning that exceeded four decades. The complex is built on a plot of 5,670 square meters and has a total area of 28,487 square meters. It has an auditorium that seats 750 and several smaller stages.

Its first Artistic Director is conductor Myron Michailidis.

== Venues and facilities ==
- The Andreas and Maria Kalokerinou Hall (AAMK), which is the venue's main auditorium with 740 seats, stage space and technical equipment suitable for opera and musical theater performances, theatrical productions, symphony concerts, ballet and contemporary dance movie screenings.
- The Experimental Stage with 180 seats and a stage dedicated to movie screenings, chamber music concerts, recitals, plays, lectures and other presentations.
- The Concert Hall with 215 seats, designed to host chamber music works, small organ and vocal ensembles, seminars, educational programs, screenings and smaller theater productions.
- The Seminar Room with 180 seats and equipment supporting the organization of conferences, workshops, exhibitions, etc., with the ability to be divided into two sections of equal capacity.
- The Small Theater, a hall with 105 seats and the ability to host conference workshops, seminars and courses, lectures and performances, cinema screenings.
- The Showroom with up to 280 seats and an area of 300 square meters.

Additional spaces include administrative offices, guest rooms, workshops, warehouses, dressing rooms, instrument storage rooms, test rooms, VIP rooms, a restaurant, ATM, shops, car parks, etc.

== See also ==
- Athens Concert Hall
- Thessaloniki Concert Hall
- List of concert halls
