= Evripides Bekos =

Greek musician and composer

Euripides Bekos (Greek: Ευρυπίδης Μπέκος) is a Greek musician and composer. He was born in Larissa, Greece in 1991.

Euripides Bekos was born in Larissa in 1991. He studied Harmony, Counterpoint, Fugue, Concert Band Orchestration and piano at the Municipal Conservatory of Larissa. He holds a degree in composition (BA) from the Department of Music Science & Art of the University of Macedonia (Thessaloniki). He was also a student of the internationally acclaimed composer and professor Christos Samaras. He is a PhD Candidate in Composition at the Leeds School of Arts under the supervision of the award-winning electroacoustic music composer Nikos Stavropoulos.

In 2010, Euripides Bekos was awarded for his work "EOS" at the "Composition and Poetry Competition of the Department of Music Science & Art of the University of Macedonia". In July 2018 his work "METEIKASMA" for string quartet won the 3rd Prize in the "Composition Competition in the memory of Dimitris Dragatakis", organized by the Greek Composers' Union. In September 2018, his work "ENARGITE" won 1st Prize in the "Composition Competition of the Panhellenic Piano Competition for children". His orchestral work "NEOTTIAN" won the 1st Prize in the "International Nikos Skalkottas Composition Competition 2019” and the "Prize for the Best Greek Composer under 35” in the same competition, awarded by the Athens State Orchestra. Also, in 2019 his orchestral work "FIDEM" was selected after a competition to be performed by the Symphonic Orchestra of the Municipality of Thessaloniki. He was invited to participate twice at the "Contemporary Music Lab" (2012 and 2018) organized by the Aristotle University of Thessaloniki at the Thessaloniki Concert Hall (Megaron) and his works there have been performed by renowned contemporary musicians and ensembles such as the Athens Saxophone Quartet.

He has composed numerous chamber music works as well as orchestral music, songs, film, theatre music, etc. He has released several personal albums as a composer and producer collaborating with some of the most prominent Greek singers while those albums were released by major recording labels such as (former) Universal Music Greece, Minos – EMI and others. His cantata "OMNYMI", based on the Hippocratic Oath, was premiered in 2018 by the Symphonic Orchestra of Larissa. This work was commissioned by the Deputy Mayor for Culture in Larissa, under the auspices of the President of the Hellenic Republic and it was the final day concert at the annual series of events entitled "Hippocrates, the Eternal Return"..

== Discography ==
- QUARK Θωμάς & Ευριπίδης Μπέκος – 2011

== Sources ==
- Ο Ευριπίδης Μπέκος στο δημοτικό Ωδείο Λάρισας-Evripides Bekos at municipal Conservatory of Larissa
- https://www.leedsbeckett.ac.uk/blogs/leeds-school-of-arts/2019/12/phd-student-wins-international-composition-competition/
