= Theater Erfurt =

Opera house in Erfurt, Germany

Coordinates: 50.9744°N 11.0177°E

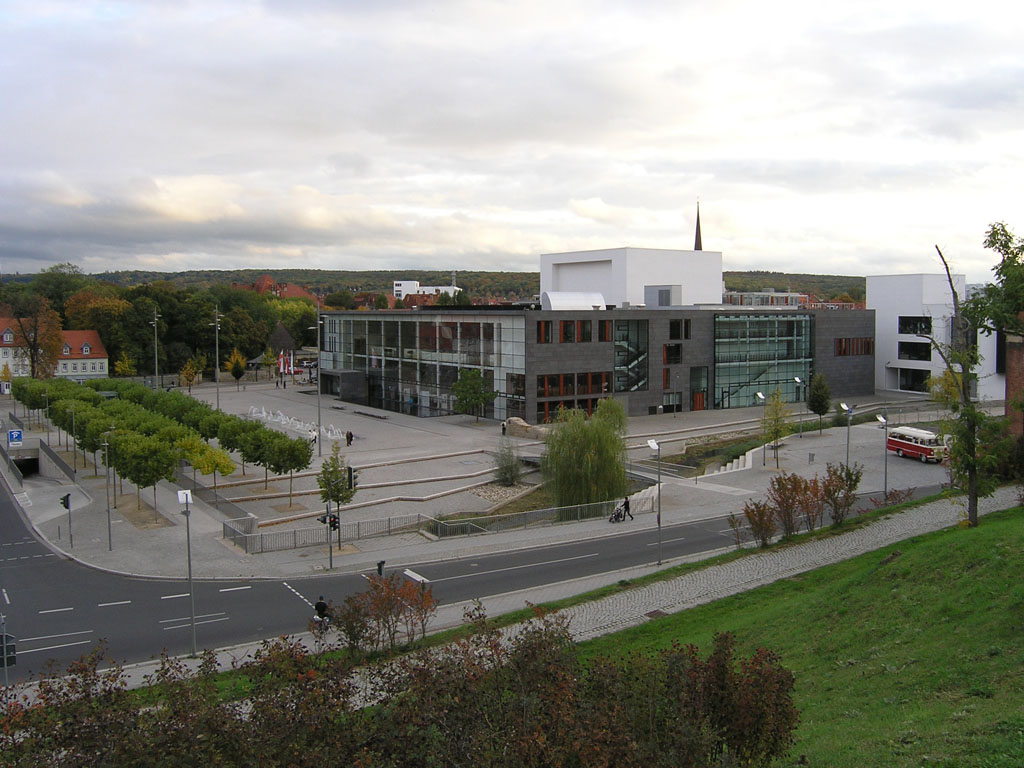
- The new theatre

General information
- Location: Erfurt, Thuringia, Germany
- Opened: 2003

Website
- www.theater-erfurt.de

The Theater Erfurt is a German municipal theater located in Erfurt, the capital of Thuringia. The main stage is in a building in the Brühlervorstadt, completed in 2003. The theater offers musical theater and concerts, played by the Philharmonisches Orchester Erfurt. Ballet and plays are offered by guest performances. The company organizes the annual open air festival DomStufen. Generalintendant Guy Montavon, who held the post since 2002, was forced out in 2024, and temporary leadership took over. The current Intendant is Christian Ilgen. Rebekah Rota will take over as Generalintendant in 2028.

== Stages ==
The main venue is in a new house, Großes Haus. The large hall seats 840 visitors, a Studio 200 visitors, which can be reduces as Salon im Studio for events for up to 100 people. The courtyard holds the stage Theatrium. Events can also be held in the rehearsal hall for the orchestra. The festival DomStufen takes place on the Domplatz (Cathedral Square) of Erfurt, seating up to 2000 spectators. The company also holds events at the Rathaus (Town Hall) and the Thomaskirche.

== Premieres ==
Montavon has initiated a program of one premiere per season, including:

Title	Composer	Date
Bachs letzte Oper	Stanley Walden	21 December 2002
Luther	Peter Aderhold	14 September 2003
Cuba libre	Cong Su	19 March 2005
Death Knocks	Christian Jost	6 May 2005
Waiting for the Barbarians	Philip Glass	10 September 2005
Wut	Andrea Lorenzo Scartazzini	9 September 2006
Mariana Pineda	Flavio Testi	8 September 2007
Martin L. – Das Musical	Gisle Kverndokk	5 Juli 2008
Der Richter und sein Henker	Franz Hummel	8 November 2008
The Orphan	Jeffrey Ching	29 November 2009
Der leuchtende Fluss	Johanna Doderer	31 October 2010
Lady Magnesia	Mieczysław Weinberg	2 Februar 2012
Der Trank der Unsterblichkeit	E. T. A. Hoffmann	28 April 2012
The Wives of the Dead	Alois Bröder	2 February 2013
Jedermann – Die Rockoper	Wolfgang Böhmer	10 July 2014
Le sang noir	François Fayt	29 November 2014

== Revivals ==
Another focus of the program are revivals of forgotten operas, including:

Title	Composer	Date
Messidor	Alfred Bruneau	2005
Fernand Cortez	Gaspare Spontini	2006
Fedra	Ildebrando Pizzetti	2008
Das Käthchen von Heilbronn	Karl Reinthaler	2009
Nana	Manfred Gurlitt	2010
Robin Hood	Albert Dietrich	2011
Die Zauberin	Peter Tschaikowsky	2011
I Medici	Ruggero Leoncavallo	2013
Sigurd	Ernest Reyer	2015 (German premiere)

== General music directors ==
People holding the position of Generalmusikdirektor (GMD) include:

- Balduin Zimmermann (1894–1904)
- Friedrich Munter (1905)
- Camillo Hildebrand (1909–1910)
- Paul Wolff (1911)
- Toni Hoff (1912)
- Paul Weißleder (1913)
- Richard Fitsch (1915–1919)
- Gustav Großmann (1920–1923)
- Franz Jung (1924–1952)
- Wilhelm Hübner (1953–1956)
- Walter König (1957)
- Ude Nissen (1958–1988)
- Wolfgang Rögner (1989–1999)
- Walter Gugerbauer (2000–2012)
- Joana Mallwitz (2014–2018)
- Myron Michailidis (2018–2022)
- Alexander Prior (2022–2026)
- Hermes Helfricht

In 2014, Joana Mallwitz was the first woman conductor named to the post of Generalmusikdirektorin (GMD) in the institution's history and at the time of her advent to the post, the youngest GMD of a German opera house. She concluded her Erfurt tenure at the close of the 2017-2018 season. Myron Michailidis served as interim GMD from 2018. He was succeeded by Alexander Prior in 2022.

== Discography ==
- Das Käthchen von Heilbronn, Karl Reinthaler, label: cpo
- Der leuchtende Fluss, Johanna Doderer, label: Quinton
- Nana, Manfred Gurlitt, label: capriccio
