= Theodore Kerkezos =

Greek saxophonist

Theodore Kerkezos is a Greek classical saxophonist.

Kerkezos (b.1962) has been collaborated and recorded the entire standard repertoire for solo saxophone with orchestras including the London Symphony, London Philharmonic Orchestra, Philharmonia (of London), St. Petersburg Philharmonic, Tchaikovsky Moscow Radio Symphony, Zurich Symphony, Boston Symphony (Pops), Vienna Chamber (Wiener Kammerorchester), Berliner Symphoniker, Reinische Philharmonie, Moscow Soloists, Moscow Virtuosi, Athens State, Thessaloniki State Symphony, "G.Enescu" Bucharest Philharmonic, Bilbao Symphony, NDR Philharmonic, National Radio of Romania, Royal Bangkok Symphony, Thuringen-Gotha Philharmonic, Meiningen Opera Symphony, Far Eastern Symphony, Massimo Belini Opera Symphony, Hamburg Klassik Philharmonie, Südwestfallen Philharmonie, Südwestdeutsch Kammerorchester, Armenian Philharmonic, appearing at halls such as Carnegie Hall, Royal Festival Hall, Wigmore Hall, Great Hall of the “Tchaikovsky” Moscow State Conservatoire, Tonhalle-Zurich, Vienna Konzerthaus, Opera of Rome, Athens Megaron Concert Hall, Beijing Concert Hall and Herod Atticus Theatre (Athens-Parthenon), Laeiszhalle-Hamburg.

== Early life ==
Kerkezos graduated from the Athens Conservatory (Babis Farantatos’ class) and continued in Paris with Daniel Deffayet and in Bordeaux with Jean-Marie Londeix.

== Career ==
He works with Yuri Bashmet, Vladimir Fedoseyev, Teodor Currentzis, Yuri Simonov, Myron Michailidis, and Michael Nyman.

His arrangements were performed by orchestras such as the London Philharmonic, St. Petersburg Philharmonic, Boston Pops, Berliner Symphoniker, Wiener Kammerorchester, Hamburg Philharmonie, Athens State Orchestra, Bremen Philharmonie, Thessaloniki State Symphony and Wiener Kammerorchester. He was twice nominated for the US 50th Grammy Awards in New York proposed by Naxos label.

In 1999, he started a collaboration with Alphonse Leduc Editions Musicales-Paris writing books for saxophone.

Works have been dedicated to him by composers including Iannis Xenakis, Friedrich Cerha, and Mikis Theodorakis.

From 2000 - 2010 he established and was the Director of the Saxophone Orchestra of Piraeus Prefecture.

He gives master classes at Boston University, Princeton, Louisiana, Providence, Vienna State (MDW), and at the Conservatories of: Boston, New England, Moscow State, and at the Academies of: Gnesin (Moscow), Chopin (Warsaw) and Kiev. He plays with H. Selmer.

His discography with the London Symphony, London Philharmonic and Philharmonia has won many awards.

== Recognition ==
- Honorary Doctor of Musical Arts from IAACC/UNESCO, for services as performer and professor at the international music stage.
- Honorary Member of the Academy (2012) Russian Academy of Natural Sciences & Arts and the United Nations along with the support of the Russian Ministries of Foreign Affairs and Justice
- Honorary Member of the Greek Composers Union (2013)
- Artist of the week by Naxos Label (2016)
- Two nominations for the New York Grammy Awards for his cd "Impressions for Saxophone and Orchestra" with the Thessaloniki State Symphony under Myron Michailidis proposed by Naxos Label
- Artist of the Year Gina Bachauer Awards (2016)

== Notable recordings ==
- Legende French Works For Saxophone and Orchestra, London Symphony/Yuri Simonov/Abbey Road Studios, Onyx label,4065
- Music for Saxophone and Orchestra, The Philharmonia Orchestra/martyn Brabbins-London, Naxos 8.557063
- Ballades for Saxophone and Orchestra, London Philharmonic/Roberto Minzcuk, Naxos 8.557454
- Impressions for Saxophone and Orchestra/Greek Classics, 2006, Thessaloniki State Symphony/Myron Michailides, Naxos 8.557992
- Dinos Constantinides, Three Saxophone Concertos, Nuremberg Symphony/Stefanos Tsialis, Centaur CRC 2871

== Concert soloist ==
- 2013: 20th Century Greece: Mikis Theodorakis, Nikos Skalkottas & Manos Hadjidakis. Thessaloniki State Symphony Orchestra, Ameritz Music Ltd.
- 2012: Virtuoso: Classical Music to Inspire, (various artists - Darius Milhaud’s Scaramouche for saxophone and orchestra, Philharmonia Orchestra) Naxos (Digital Compilations)
- 2012: Dinos Constantinides' Works, with the Slovak National Radio Symphony and Louisiana Sinfonietta. Concerto No. 5, and Music for Bill, cond. Mario Kosik, (to be released in December 2013 by Centaur-USA Label)
- 2011: My First Orchestra Album, Various artists - Darius Milhaud's Scaramouche for saxophone and orchestra - Philharmonia Orchestra. Naxos (Digital Compilations-iTunes) * 2011: My First Classical Music Album, Various artists - Glazunov's Concerto - Philharmonia Orchestra). Naxos 8.578203
- 2011: Athens Camerata, George Koumentakis’ Concerto for saxophone quartet, piano & strings with George Lazaridis (piano) and Kerkezos Saxophone Quartet at the Athens Megaron Hall. MDG Label
- 2010: Nuremberg Symphony, Bertold Hummel's Works, recorded at the Meistersinger Halle for the Bayerischen Rundfunk (Bavaria Radio-Germany), cond. Marc Kissoczy.
- 2010: Janacek Philharmonic of Czech Republic cond. Peter Feranec on Alkis Baltas' Monoloque.
- 2009: Thessaloniki State Symphony. Manos Hadjidakis’ Mr. Knoll, for Naxos Label Radio.
- 2008: Nuremberg Symphony. Darius Milhaud’s Scaramouche and Claude Debussy's Rhapsody, for the Bayerischen Rundfunk (Bavaria Radio-Germany), cond. Thomas Calb.
- 1997: Athens Camerata. Thanos Mikroutsikos, For Saxophone and Strings and Love and Dreams, cond. Alexander Myrat, AGORA Label 130.1
