= 2011 BEKO Super Cup =

Tournament details
- Dates: August 19 – September 21
- Teams: 4

Final positions
- Champions: Greece

2011 BEKO Super Cup was a mini-tournament held between 4 European national basketball teams in preparation for the FIBA EuroBasket 2011. The tournament was held from August 19 until August 21 in Bamberg, Germany. Greece won the tournament with a 3–0 record.

== Participants ==
- Germany - host nation
- Turkey
- Belgium
- Greece

== Standings ==
Team	Pld	W	L	PF	PA	PD	Pts
Greece	3	3	0	201	155	+46	6
Germany	3	2	1	191	186	+5	5
Turkey	3	1	2	156	186	−30	4
Belgium	3	0	3	186	207	−21	3

== Results ==
August 19

Greece	62–38	Turkey

Bamberg, Germany

August 19

Germany	71–65	Belgium

Bamberg, Germany

August 20

Turkey	66–60	Belgium

Bamberg, Germany

August 20

Germany	56–69	Greece

Bamberg, Germany

August 21

Greece	70–61	Belgium

Bamberg, Germany

August 21

Germany	64–52	Turkey

Bamberg, Germany
