= Bekoe =

Bekoe or rarely Bekoé is a Ghanaian surname. Notable people with this surname include:

- Cofie Bekoe (born 1988), Ghanaian football player
- Daniel Adzei Bekoe (1928–2020), Ghanaian chemist and academic
- Derek Darko Ohene Assifo Bekoe (born 1967), Ghanaian politician
- Dwamena Bekoe, Ghanaian politician
- Eric Bekoe (born 1986), Ghanaian football player
- Frank Asiedu Bekoe (born 1977), Ghanaian politician
- Frederick Asare Bekoe (born 1967), Ghanaian military officer, Chief of Air Staff
- Godfred Bekoé (born 1992), Ghanaian football player
- Julian Owusu-Bekoe (born 1989), English-born Ghanaian entrepreneur, speaker, and former football player
- Veronica Bekoe, Ghanaian biologist

== See also ==
- Stephen Bekoe Mfodwo (1930–2015), Ghanaian public servant
