= Demetrios Lialios =

Greek composer

Demetrios Lialios (Δημήτριος Λιάλιος, Patras, 1869 – 13 March 1940) was a Greek composer. He studied at the Hochschule für Musik und Theater München under Ludwig Thuille. He was possibly the first modern Greek composer to write chamber music. His oeuvre includes an opera, a requiem, 22 orchestral compositions, 14 chamber music works, and 2 compositions for Greek Orthodox liturgy. His Requiem in B minor, titled Missa pro Defunctis is perhaps the first large-scale modern Greek choral work. He also composed lieder in various languages. Between 1919 and 1935 he was vice-consul of Greece in Munich.
