= Alea III =

Music Ensemble

Alea III is a Boston, Massachusetts-based music ensemble that is devoted to the promotion, performance, and teaching of contemporary classical music.

== About the ensemble ==
Alea III was founded in 1978 by Music Director Theodore Antoniou, the third such ensemble organized by him (following Alea II at Stanford University). Alea III is the contemporary music ensemble in residence at Boston University and presents several concerts each season, all of which offer complimentary admission.

The name of the ensemble is derived from multiple sources: the Greek word alea means "to wander," and in Latin, alea refers to "a die or dice used for playing at games of chance." Aleatoric music is also a source of inspiration; in the context of the ensemble, it concerns the expression of a multiplicity of musical directions, styles, and performance practices. In all, the group has performed more than 1,300 works by over 750 composers, including pieces by Iannis Xenakis, György Ligeti, and Arvo Pärt.

Alea III has recorded for the FM Records, Navona Records, and Capstone Records labels.

== ALEA III International Composition Competition ==
In addition to performances, Alea III holds an annual musical composition competition open to young professional composers under 40 years old. Established in 1979, the competition has produced more than 6,500 new scores, 215 of which have been performed. A prize of $2500 USD is awarded to the composer of the winning piece. This competition is notable for allowing the submission of a wide range of performing forces, from solo instrument or voice up to a fifteen player chamber ensemble. Duration requirements vary widely as well, from 6 to 15 minutes. Among the composers whose work the ensemble has premiered are Lukas Foss, Aaron Jay Kernis, Andy Vores, and Laura Schwendinger.

== Selected discography ==
- Nikos Kypourgos, Silence, the king is listening (1994) short musical for soprano, tenor, baritone, female chorus and chamber orchestra (FM Records)
- Laura Schwendinger, Chamber Concerto (1993) for piano and mixed ensemble of 16 players (Capstone Records)
- Elizabeth Vercoe, Despite our differences #1 (1984) for violin, cello & piano (Navona Records)
