= Giorgos Koumendakis =

Greek composer

Giorgos Koumendakis (Greek: Γιώργος Κουμεντάκης) is a Greek composer. He was appointed musical director and creator of musical scenario for the opening and closing ceremonies of the 2004 Summer Olympics in Athens.

== Biography ==
Giorgos Koumendakis was born in Rethymnon (Crete) in 1959 to Ioannis and Evaggelia Koumendakis. He took the first music lessons (accordion) in Rethymno and began to compose at the age of 15. He pursued his studies in Advanced Theory with Diamantis Diamantopoulos at the Hellenic Conservatory in Athens and has attainted seminars of music composition with P. Boulez, Ligeti György, I. Xenakis, A. Goehr and others in Paris.

In 1990, he was awarded the second prize of the Municipality of Athens for a music work concerning the National Rebirth and in 1992 Koumendakis was awarded the “Prix de Rome” and was ‘pensionnaire’ for 1993 in Villa Mediciis in Rome. In 1994, he was awarded the “Nikos Kazantzakis Prize” from the Municipality of Herakleion. From 1998 to 2000, he was “Composer in Residence” in London for the Hellenic Concert series, Clio Gould and BT Ensemble, receiving support by the Michaels Marks Charitable Trust. He undertook the musical direction and created the music concept for the opening and closing ceremonies of the 2004 Athens Olympic Games.

Koumendakis has composed more than 100 works including vocal-choral, orchestral, chamber, solo, operatic music, as well as music for dance, modern theater and ancient Greek drama. He has also collaborated with other artists in various multi-and new media projects (video-art, animation, installations). His compositions reveal influences from different music styles and currents, historical and contemporary, not only from the milieu of the savant music literature but also from the folkloric music of his country. His compositions have been performed in many international festivals, conferences: World Music Days Festival(Germany 1987, Hong Kong 1988, Oslo 1990), Frankfurt Feste (1987), Conferenza Musicale Mediterranea (Palermo, 1992, 1997), Nieuwe Muziek Middelburg Festival (1990), Presences-Radio France (Paris, 1992, 2004), Festival of Athens(2005, 2006, 2009, 2010), Cultural Year of Greece in China (Beijing 2007-8) etc.

Some of the ensembles and orchestras which have performed his works include the: Quattuor Leonardo, Ensemble Intercontemporain, European Community Youth Orchestra, Oslo Sinfonietta, Oslo Philharmonic Chamber Choir, Divertimento Ensemble, Xenakis Ensemble, Hong Kong Ensemble, Arraymusic Ensemble, New Hellenic Quartet, La Camerata Friends of Music Orchestra, Beijing Symphony Orchestra, Accademia Musicale Siciliana, Accentus/Axe 21 Chamber Choir, Nederlands Blazers Ensemble, BT Scottish Ensemble, Kronos Quartet, Nash Ensemble, Russian State Symphony Orchestra Young Russia, Tangos a Cuatro, City of Oxford Orchestra, Orchestra of Colors (Greece), State Orchestra of Thessaloniki, State Orchestra of Athens, String Orchestra of Patras, Orchestra of the National Opera, Macedonian Saxophone Quartet, Nederlands Blazers Ensemble, Prism Saxophone Quartet, Ensemble Octopus, The Greek Ensemble of modern music, Cosmos Saxophone Quartet, Saxophone Quartet of Theodoros Kerkezos, Ensemble Recherche, and opus21musikplus.

His music was directed among others by Arturo Tamayo, Gunther Schuller, Diego Masson, James Judd, Mathias Bamert, Ingo Metzmacher, Martin Brabbins, Gaetano Colajanni, Olivier Cuendet, Christian Eggen, Henri Gallois, Christopher Warren-Green, Henry Kucharzyk, Stefan Skold, Myron Michailidis, Miltos Logiades, Alexandros Myrat, Marios Papadopoulos, Nikos Tchouchlos, Alkis Baltas

== Compositions ==
(Abbreviations follow the IMSLP:Abbreviations for Instruments - IMSLP, International Music Score Library Project)

=== Chamber music ===
- String Quartet (1976-1977) (ms, unknown)
- Window(1977) (ms, unknown)
- Two pieces for flute and piano (1981) (ms, unknown)
- She chanted loud some alien hymn of wizardry, String quartet (1981), str[2.1.1.0], dur : 8΄00
- The Grimm Brothers’ Suite (1996), str[2.1.1.0], dur. : 10΄00
- Socrates in Athens, 13.07.01 (2001) for 5 percussionists, (3 vib, 2 xyl), dur. : 28΄00
- Modo, in three parts, 2 pf, 3 pianists• pf, 3 pianists• 2 pf, 2 pianists (2007), dur.: 3΄00
- Five more steps until you fall asleep (2008), picc, fl, 2 cl.[Bb], str[2.0.2.1], 2 vib, pf 4 hands, dur.: 10΄
- Hovering in Between (2009), 2 sax (sopr. and baritone), dur.: 5΄00
- The silent step of the bear (2012), sax (soprano and alto), perc, bajan, dur.: 11΄00 (The man bear, Dance 1, sax sop, perc, bajan, Dance 2, sax alto, perc, bajan, Dance 3, sax alto, perc, bajan)

(See also cycles)

=== Solo music ===
- Approche (1980), pf, dur.: 7΄30
- Horomimos (1988), pf, dur.: 3΄00
- Melody for mandolin (1994), dur.: 6΄00
- Firefly (2000), hpd, dur.: 2΄00
- Bumble-bee (2000), hpd, dur.: 0΄ 30
- Melody for guitar (2001), dur.: 8΄30
- Forget me not (2007), sax/cl, dur.: 10΄30
- Daring Combinations (2002), pf, dur.: 15΄00
- Forget me, (2009), fl

(See also cycles)

=== Operas ===
- Suicide I, Suicide II (1978-9), libr. G.K., graphic score, actor, 11 str bowed ad. lib.
- Daily Suicides (1980 – 81), libr. G.K., graphic score, sop, alt, ten, bass, 2 actors, orch : (2 picc,2fl, 3ob,1cl[G], 1 cl[Mib], 3 c[Bb], 1 bcl[Bb], 3 bn, 2 bbn,4 hn, 1 tpt[D], 3 tpt[C], 2 tbn, 1 btbn, 1 tba, 1 perc, str[10 vl I, 10 vl II. 10.8.6], dur. : 90'
- The Day will come... (first version 1986), sop, bryt, wq[1.1.1.1], sq[2.1.1.], bc[hn, tpt, tbn, cb, perc, pf], based on verses from Iliad and Odyssey of Homer in their original language, dur. : 24΄00
- The Day will come... (1995 rev.), sop, bryt, mch, wq[1.1.1.1], sq and bc[hn, tpt, tbn, cb, perc, pf], text based on verses from Iliad and Odyssey of Homer in their original language, dur. : 50΄00
- Omiros-Orimos (Homer-Mature) (2013), sop (Pinelopi), mez (Evriklia), ten (Tilemahos), bass (Odysseas), cch, 1fl, 1ob, 1sax (cl), hn, tbn, bajan, perc, 2vl, 1va, 1vc, 1cb, libr. from Homer's Odyssey in the original language dur.: 30΄00
- The murderess (2014), libr. of Yannis Svolos based on Alexandros Papadiamantis’ novel ‘The Murderess’, sop (Fragoyiannou), mez (Marousso), bass (Ioassaf), sop (Delharo), bryt (Yannis gardener), sop (Yiannou), sop (Mother of Xenoula), ten (Police officer 1), bryt (Judge), ten (Police officer 2), sop (Crinio), sop (Toula), sop (Myrsouda), bryt or bass (Doctor), actrice (Amersa), actor (Constantis), mch, fch, cch, vv[2sop, 1 mez, 1 alt],1 picc, 1fl, 2ob, 1cl[Bb], 1bcl[Bb], bn, cbn, 4 hn, 2 tpt, 2 trb, 1 percussionist, sax., bajan, percussionist (on stage), string orch

=== Choral music ===
- In Dolore (1988), text of Marcus Minucius Felix (in Latin), ch a capella, dur. : 3΄00
- Dracula, 5/6 voices, in six parts, on liturgical texts and invented texts (G.K.) for (3 sop, 1 alt, 1 ten, 1 bass), chamber orchfl, ob, cl, tpt, tbn, tba, 4 vl, 2va, 2vc, 1cb), dur.: 70΄00 see dance
- Socrates in Athens (2001), see chamber music
- The Pedal Tone of a Child (2010), see orchestral music
- The Pedal Tone of A Middle – Aged Man, concerto for pf (No. 4)(2009), sax quartet and string orch, dur.: 17΄30 see cycles

=== Vocal music ===
- Remoteness 3 or about Love (1976, rev. 1977-8), text from Plato's Symposium, for bryt-narrator, fl, 2 pf, dur.: 10΄00
- Attempt to Sleep (1979), on poems of Giannis Kontos for sop and orchestra (1picc, 2fl, 2ob, 1 eh, 1cl[Bb], 1 cl[A], 1 bcl[Bb], 2 bn, 1bbn, 4 hn, 2tpt, 2 tbn, 1 tba, 6 perc, vl I, vl II, vas, vcs, cbs)
- 3 Poems (1979–80), graphic score, text of G.K., for mez and orch (1picc, 2fl, 2ob, 1 eh, 2cl, 1 bcl, 2bn, 2 sax, 6 hn, 3 tpt, 3 tbn, 1 )

tba, 9 perc, vl I, vl II, va, vc, cb

- Stratis Thalassinos in the Underworld (see dance)
- Elpomai (I Hope) (1984), oratorio for bryt, 28v ch, 10 brass (3 Hn, 3 tpt, 3 tbn, 1 tba) str[10vl I,10vl II, 10.8.6], dur. : 30΄00 on texts of Thucydides, St Paul, ancient Greek texts
- Fatherland(Patria and Kingdom Of the Birds) (1987) on poems of Tasos Galatis for sop, mez, cl, vl, vc, cb, hpd, dur.: 6΄30
- Ypsipolisapolis(1988), on texts from Sophocles’ Antigone, for mez, mch, (fl, ob, tpt, 2 pf, 3 vc, 2cb), dur. : 23΄30
- Eros Demon (Love Demon) (1991), on poems of Sappho, for contra-ten, 2 pf, dur. : 22΄30
- The song of Hedda Gabler (1994), on text of G.K. and Giannis Houvardas (in Swedish), v and pf, dur. : 1΄37
- A King that Hears (1994), v and pf, text G.K. (in Italian)
- Iphigenia on the Bridge of Arta (1994–95), see dance
- Requiem(for the End of Love) (1995), on the poem ‘Lazarus’ of Dimitris Kapetanakis for sop, mch, 3cl[Bb], 2tbn., str orch(4 vl I, 3 vl II, 3 altos, 4 vc, 2 cb), dur. : 37΄00
- The Snowman (1996) on text of Elena Pega in English for contra-ten and six instruments (2vl, va, 2vc, and pf), dur. : 16΄11
- Theonoe's Concerto (1996), see concertos
- Dracula (1997), see dance
- Missa Harmoniae Verbi (1998) on liturgical texts in Hebrew, Latin and Greek) for sop, mez, ten, bass, ch, sq and orch (2ob, 2 bcl, 2bn, 2 hn, 2tpt, 2 tbn, vl I, vl II, va, vc, cb), dur. : 30΄00
- Bacchae– Overture (1993), text of G.K. and Giannis Houvardas for contra-ten and str orch (12vl, 6va, 4vc, 4cb), dur. : 10΄00-11΄28,
- Odyssee: Heimkehr (2013), for cch, 1vl, 1va, 1vc, 1cb, 1sax, pf

(See also cycles)

=== Concertos ===
- Concertino for piano and 7 instruments (1989), for pf and fl, cl, vl, va, vc, mar, vib (1 percussionist), dur.: 7΄30
- Concerto for piano and 10 instruments (1991, rev. 1992) for pf, fl, ob, cl, bn, hn, tpt, tbn, va, vc, cb
- Theonoe's concerto (1996), for v and str orch (12vl, 4 va, 3 vc, 2 cb), dur.: 15΄00-17΄08
- Diary of Confinement, concerto for pf and str No.3 (1999), for 3vl I, 3vl II, 2va, 2Vc, 1 Cb, dur.: 25΄30

(See also cycles)

=== Orchestral music ===
- Priceless Leaf(1990), for orch(2 picc, 1 fl, 3 ob, 2 cl, 1bcl, 2bn, 1 cbn, 3 hn, 4 tpt, 3 tbn, 1 tba, pf, 4 perc, 27 vl, 11 va, 10 vc, 8cb), dur.: 21΄00
- Out of Time (1997), 2cl[Bb], str sq, str orch
- Journey Into the Night(Voyage dans la Nuit,) (1998), for orch[2.2.2.2 – 4.2.3.1 – 3 perc (timp) – vl I, vl II, vl III, vl IV, va I,

va II, vc I, vc II, cb], dur.: 17΄00

- Storm(1997), for 2cl, 3perc, str orch(3vl I, 3vl II, 3vl III, 3vl IV, 2 va I, 2 va II, 2vc I, 2vc II, 2cb) see dance (2nd part)
- Amor Fati (2007), for 1picc, 2fl, 2ob, 1 picc cl[D]/[Eb], 2cl[Bb ], 1sax sop, 1sax alto, 4hn, 3vibr, 14vl I, 12vl II, 10va, 8vc, 6cb, dur.: 12΄00

(See also cycles)

=== Dance ===
- Remoteness 3 (or about Love (1976, rev. 1977-8) text from Plato's Symposium for bryt-narrator, fl and 2 pf, dur.: 10΄00 see vocal
- The Leaden Soldier (1982), suite in five scenes for fl, vl, pf and perc, after H.C.Andersen's tale, dur.: 50΄00
- Stratis Thalassinos in the Underworld (1982-3), on the poem of Georges Seferis, for bryt, 2 quintets (hn, vl, va, vc, cb, and cl[Bb], vl, va, vc, cb) and bc (2 perc, 3vc, 3cb, pf), dur.: 30΄30
- Sacrifice/Ipsipolisapolis (1988), From Sophocles’ Antigone, see vocals
- Sappho(part 1 of the Moons) (1993), see Eros Demon
- Iphigenia on the Bridge of Arta (1994–95), text of G.K. and Dimitris Papaïoannou for sop, tpt and 2 sampled pf, dur.: 30΄00
- Requiem (for the end of love)(1995), see vocal music
- Dracula(1997), on liturgical and invented texts (G.K.), for 6 v (3 sop, 1 alt, 1ten, 1 bass) and chamber orch(fl, ob, cl, tpt, tbn,

tuba, 4 vl, 2va, 2vc, 1cb), dur. :70΄00

- Storm(1997), in 3 parts, for 2cl, 3perc and str orch

=== Music for ancient dramas ===
- Iphigenia in Tauris, Euripides, National Theater, Epidaurus’ Festival,(1981)
- Electra, Sophocles, Art theater of Karolos Koun, Epidaurus’ Festival,(1984)
- Hippolitos, Euripides, National Theater, Epidaurus’ Festival,(1989)
- Helen, Euripides, Theater of the North (Theatro tou Notou), Epidaurus’ Festival,(1996)
- Iphigenia in Tauris, Euripides, Sfendoni Theater, Athens,(1998)

=== Theater music ===
- The dream of the scarecrow E. Trivizas, Theater of Agrinio, (1986)
- Hedda Gabler, H. Ibsen, Theater of the South (Theatro tou Notou), Athens (1994)
- Ostrich's Feathers, A. Staïkos, Theater of Kefallinias’ street (theater odou Kefallinias), (1994)
- A King that hears, Italo Calvino, 7th Biennale, Lisbon, Portugal, (1994)
- The Misanthrope, Molière, Chamber's Theater, (1994)
- The three sisters, Anton Chekhov, Theater of the South, (1994)
- The beginning of life, D. Dimitriadis, Theater of the South, (1995)
- Maybug, Chr. Christofis, Theatrical Corporation Diplos Eros, (1995)
- Collection of Courteline Georges' plays under the title ‘The shaken pear-tree’, Theater of the South, (1995)
- I don't believe in your eyes, Theatrical Performance, Theatre of New World, Athens, directed by Emmanouil Koutsourelis, coll. with A. Psichoulis, G. Gyparakis (2000)

=== Cinema ===
- I m tired (Είμαι κουρασμένος), short film of Vassilis Alexakis
- Special day, (Σήμερα γάμος γίνεται), a short metrage film by Nicolas Kolovos(2012), prod. ERT A.E.
- Marjoram, a film by Olga Malea, 2013
- i'm not him (ben o degilim), a film by Tayfun Pirselimoglu, Istanbul Film Festival 2014: Best Film, Best Script, Best

Music

=== Music for the Olympic games ===
- Olympia-Dialogue (2004), for perc orch, dur.: 1΄19
- Audience claps (2004), for perc orch, dur.: 0΄13
- Bells (2004), for orchestral bells, dur.: 0΄23
- Heartbeat (2004), electr, dur.: 0΄33
- Intro to the welcome (2004), for perc orch, dur.: 0΄41
- Olympia–Intro (2004), perc orch, dur.: 0΄15
- Sculptures and cubes(2004), for large orchestra (transcr.), dur.: 1΄00 (see transcriptions/arrangements)
- Couple(2004), for pf, dur.: 0΄55

=== Music for video-art ===
- Mediterranean Desert (1998-2000) (see cycles)
- Socrates in Athens,(2001) (see vocals)
- Pic-nic, of Socratis Socratous

=== Cycles ===
(Each piece can be performed separately)

‘Symmolpa’:

- Symmolpa I (1984), pf, dur.: 6΄00
- Symmolpa II (1984 and 1986), fl, cl, vl, va, pf, dur.: 9΄00
- Symmolpa III (1984 and 1985), fl, ob, cl, bcl, bn, hn, tpt, tbn, 2 perc, pf, str quintet, dur. : 9΄00
- Symmolpa IV (1984), ob, cl, hn, 2perc, pf, vl, va, vc, cb, dur. : 7΄00
- Symmolpa V (1984), cl, bcl, pf, 2vl, 2va, 2vc, 2cb, dur. : 9΄00

‘Symphania’:

- Symphania I (1984 and 1988), for two pf, dur.: 10΄00
- Symphania II (1988), vc, pf, dur. : 12΄00

‘Mediterranean Desert’ for pf or hpd:

- Three Mediterranean fishes, pf, dur.: 7΄00: Rainbow-Coris Julis (1998), pf, dur.: 2΄30, Grouper-Epinephaelos Aeneus (1998), pf /hpd, dur.: 1΄35, Garfish-Belone Belone (1998), pf /hpd, dur.: 1΄30
- From the Tithys to the Mediterranean (Introduction) (1999), for pf, dur.: 10΄00
- The caterpillar and the treble-bar of L. Van B. (aplocera plagiata), (1999), for pf, dur.: 3΄30
- Sparrow, (1999), for pf (passer domesticus), dur.: 0΄ 42
- Cormorant, (1999), for pf, dur.: 2΄ 15
- Horse, (1999), for hpd, dur.: 1΄50
- Praying Mantis (Empusa fasciata) (1999), for pf, dur.: 3΄15
- Two Black Vultures and their Terrifying Dance (aegypius monachus) (1999), for pf dur.: 1΄00
- Little Egret and Hunter by the banks of the Strimonas (1999), for pf, dur.: 7΄10
- Bee and Wild Tulip, a bee is visiting the tulipa sylvestris (1999), for pf, dur.: 2΄30
- Dragonfly (orthetrum cancellatum) (1999) for hpd/pf, dur.: 1΄30
- Windflower (anemone pavonima) (2000), for pf, dur.: 7΄30 (two versions)
- Three Mediterranean herbs (Thyme – Mint – Sage) (2000), for pf/hpd Thyme: dur. : 1΄10- 1΄17, Mint: dur. : 1΄10, Sage: dur.: 1΄20, 1΄23
- Damselfly(agrion virgo) (2000), for hpd, dur.: 1΄00
- Fly (2000), for hpd/pf, dur.: 1΄30
- Slow-Worm (2000), for hpd/pf, dur.: 1΄10
- Le Cormoran de Iannis Xenakis, The cormorant of Iannis Xenakis for pf (2002), dur.: 4΄00
- The Silk Road (2002), for pf
- Couple (Ζευγάρι) (2004), for pf
- A Cricket in the Black bird's Gorge (2012), 3 pianists on a pf, dur.: 8΄00
- A Black bird in the Cricket's Gorge (2013), ww[1.1.1.1.] and hn

Typewriter tunes:

- Typewriter Tune for violin solo (2004), (and v), dur.: 4΄00
- Typewriter tune for marimba solo (2005), dur.: 10΄00
- Typewriter tune for cimbalom (santouri) solo (2006), dur. : 10΄30
- Typewriter tune for lute of Constantinople (lafta) solo (2006), dur.: 10΄30
- Typewriter Tune for sax quartet (2006), dur. : 10΄30
- Typewriter Tune for 6 pf and 12 pianists ensemble (2006), dur. : 11΄00
- Forget me not (2007), sax/cl, dur.: 10΄30
- Typewriter Tune for tangos a cuatro, (2007–08), for bajan, pf, vl and cb, dur. : 6΄00
- Point of No Return, (2008), sq for 2 vl, (the vl II plays also mandolin), va (plays also accordion), vc, dur.: 13΄00
- Forget me, (2009), fl

Pedal tones:

- The Pedal Tone of A Middle-aged Man (2009), concerto for pf No. 4, sax quartet and str orch, dur.: 17΄30
- The Pedal Tone of a Child (2010), 2 picc, 2 fl, 2 ob, 2 cl[Bb /A], 2 bcl[in Bb], 2 bn, 4 hn, 2 tpt, 2 tbn, pf, vn I, vn II, va, vc,

cb, dur.: ca. 17 min.

- The Pedal Tone for an Armenian Melody (2010), for organ and hpd, dur.: 5΄00
- The Pedal Tone of a Crazy Old Man (2010-2011), for guitar and bajan, dur.: 9΄00
- The murderess (2014) (see operas)

=== Transcriptions/Arrangements ===
- The Suite of Grimm Brothers (1997), for gtr
- The Grimm Brothers' Suite (1996), for str orch, dur.: 15΄00-16΄00
- Cormorant (2001), for pf/pf and cb/pf and bn, dur : 2΄15 or 2΄30
- Fly (2001), for pf/hpd and cb, for pf/hpd and bn, dur. : 1΄30
- Grouper (2001), for pf/hpd, pf/hpd and cb, or for pf/hpd and bn, dur.: 1΄35-2΄00
- Grouper (2002), for gtr, dur.: 2΄30
- Sculptures and cubes, (2004), for large orch, dur.: 1΄00 (from the 3rd symphony of G. Mahler)
- The song of Hedda Gabler (2012), for 2 gtr, dur.: 2΄00
- Five more steps until you fall asleep (2012), for baroque orch(2fl, 2ob, hpd, theorbo, pf 4 hands, str orch)
- Five more steps until you fall asleep (2012), for 1picc, 1fl, 2cl, 2 vibr, pf 4 hands, str orch
- Typewriter Tune for amplified chamber ensemble (2009 arrangement by Yannis Sambrovalakis of the Typewriter Tune for 6 pf and 12

pianists), for 1 picc, 1 ob, 1 picc cl[Eb], 1 alto sax[Eb], 1 cbn, 2 tpt[C], 1 ten tbn, 1 btbn, 4 percussionists, 1 cb, 1 Electric Bass, dur.: 9΄30

== Other musical activities ==
G. Koumendakis was appointed general secretary of the Hellenic Union of Contemporary Music. From 1999-2001 he was artistic director of the ‘Nikos Skalkottas Ensemble’. Actually he is artistic director of the ‘Cyclus Ensemble’ since 2013. He was member of several committees about composition and performance competitions (Competition of composition and music direction ‘Dimitris Mitropoulos’, Synthermeia, Competition for guitar soloists-Patras’ Municipal Conservatory). He has participated in music conferences and given lectures on music (‘Music Village’, Houdetsi) and has supported young Greek composers during the Workshops of the Greek Composer's Union. He has collaborated on seven occasions with the dance group Omada Edafous of Dimitris Papaioannou. He is a member of OPEP's (Organisation of promotion of the Greek Culture) board of directors. The Onassis Cultural Center, the Athens’ and Thessaloniki's Music Halls have presented hommage on Koumendakis’ music. From 2012 Koumendakis is composer in residence at the National Opera.

== Recordings ==
- Requiem (for the end of love), Iphigenia on the Bridge of Arta, Omada Edafous and Studio 19, 1995
- The suite of the Grimm Brothers (ed. Agra), 1996
- Dracula, music for the ballet of the Omada Edafous, OE S19 CD 02, 1997
- She chanted loud some alien hymn of wizardry, String quartet (1981), From the Greek music avant-garde, ETEBA, 1998
- The suite of the Grimm Brothers, Lyra
- Sage, Mint, Thyme (from ‘Mediterranean Desert’ cycle), Works of Greek composers for piano, Lyra, 2003
- 4 works for Aris Christofellis (The song of Hedda Gabler, The Snowman, 3 mediterranean fishes, Eros Daemon, Bacchae-Overture),

Seirios, SMH:20022 2, 2002

- Journey into the night (Orchestra of colors), 2006
- Forget me, (Greek Flute Music of the 20th and 21st Centuries, Katrin Zenz), 2011

== Edited works ==
- Horomimos, Greek Music Cycle, Nakas, 1988
- Concerto for piano and 7 instruments, Papagrigoriou-Nakas, 1994
- The day will come... (Essetai Imar...), Papagrigoriou-Nakas, 1999
- Suite of the Grimm Brothers, Papagrigoriou-Nakas, 2001
- The Silk Road, The Associated Board of the Royal Schools of Music, c2002
- Forget Me (2009), Hellenic Music Center, HMC 2009, ISMN: 979-0-9016000-7-2
- Melody for Guitar, Papagrigoriou-Nakas, 2010
- Symmolpa II, Papagrigoriou-Nakas, 2010
- Symmolpa III, Papagrigoriou-Nakas, 2010
- Amor Fati (2007), Hellenic Music Center, 2010, ISMN: 979-0-9016000-2-7
- Typewriter Tune for amplified chamber ensemble (2006, 2009), Hellenic Music Center, 2010
- Point of no return, Hellenic Music Center, 2010
- The Pedal Tone for a Middle-aged Man (2009), concerto for pf (No. 4), sax quartet and str orch, Hellenic Music Center, 2011
- Five more steps until you fall asleep, for chamber ensemble, Hellenic Music Center, 2012
- Forget Me Not for alto sax (2007), Hellenic Music Center, 2013, ISMN: 979-0-801168-00-9
- Forget Me Not for cl (2007/2010), Hellenic Music Center, 2013, ISMN: 979-0-801168-01-6

== Sources ==
- Giannopoulos, Ilias(2009). "Text and music relation in the opera of Giorgos Koumentakis 'Essetai Imar'(1995)".www.mmb.org.gr Retrieved 2 November 2014.
- Hnaraki, Maria (2013). Sing In Me, Muse, and Through Me Tell the Story: Greek Culture Performed. USA: Zorbas Press. p. 308. ISBN 978-0927379-16-8.
- Kalogeropoulos, Takis (1998). The dictionary of Greek music. Athens: Gialellis.
- Kordellou, Aggeliki (2009). "Structural analogies and "contrapuntal" relations between sound and image in Giorgos Koumentakis 'Mediterranean Desert'(in Greek)".www.mmb.org.gr Retrieved 2 November 2014.
- Kordellou, Aggeliki (2015). "Representations of Mediterranean nature in Giorgos Koumendakis’ piano and harpsichord cycle Mediterranean Desert".. Retrieved 7/7/2015.
- Kordellou, Aggeliki (2014)."Από τον Πλάτωνα στον Παπαδιαμάντη...: Η ελληνική γραμματεία στο έργο του Γιώργου Κουμεντάκη, Hellenic Journal of Music, Education, and Culture, vol. 5, Article 5, ISSN 1792-2518, www.hejmec.eu.
- Symeonidou, Aleka (1995). Dictionary of Greek composers. Athens: Ph. Nakas.
