= Nikos Xanthoulis =

Greek composer,, author and soloist

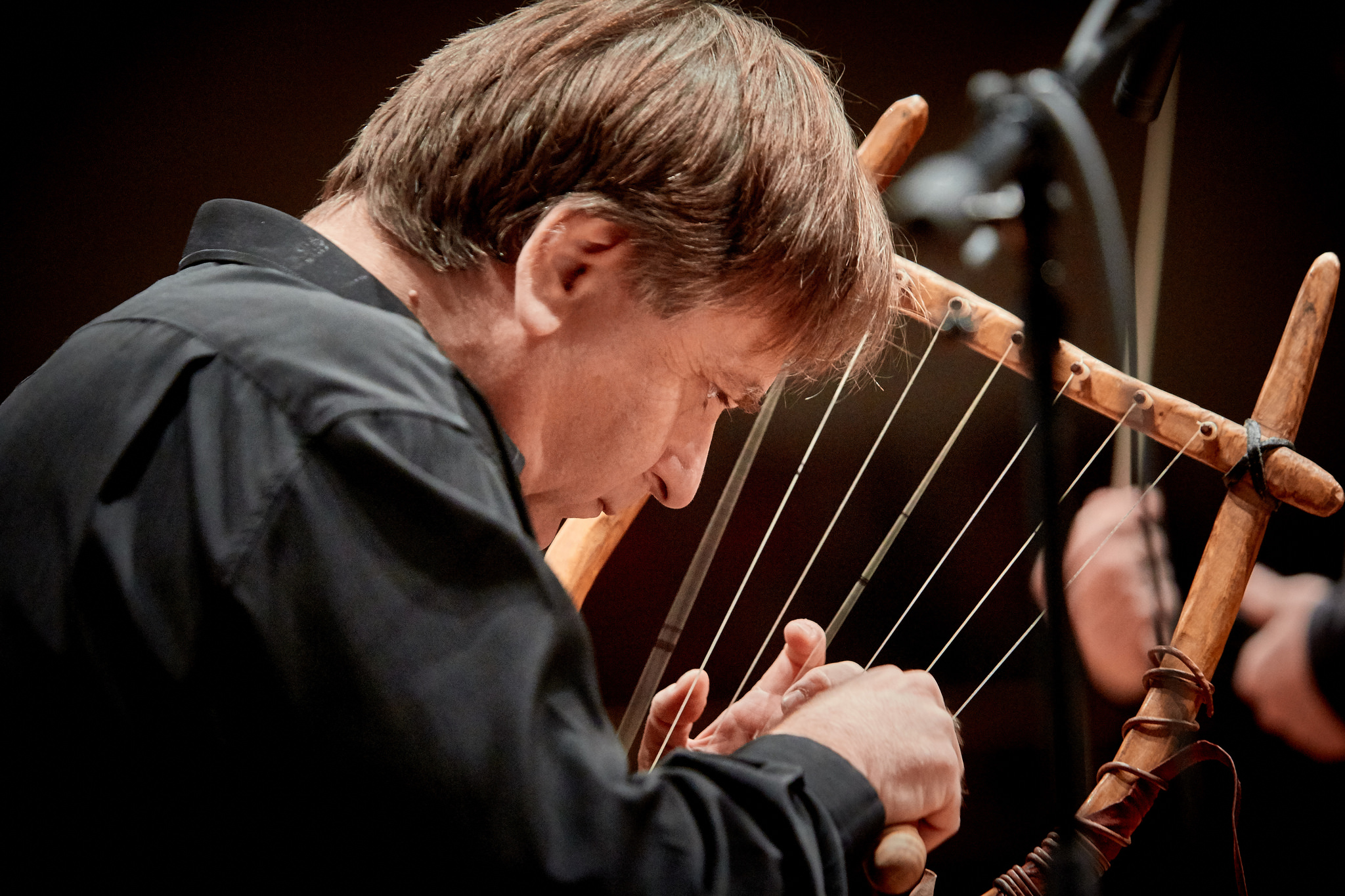

Nikos Xanthoulis (Greek: Νίκος Ξανθούλης, born Νικόλαος Γεωργίου Ξανθούλης; 1962) is a Greek composer, lyrist and author. He served as principal trumpet player of the Greek National Opera for 25 years (1983-2009), led the Educational Department (2009-2012) and served as an artistic consultant (2016-2021) of the same institution. He is Assistant Researcher with the Academy of Athens (2009–present), Correspondent Member of the Archaeological Institute of America (2010–present) and Kress Lecturer, and Professor of Composition (2004–2020) and Trumpet (1984-2013) at the Athens Conservatory. He was also Artistic Director of the Public Broadcasting Music Ensembles (2014 - 2015) and Tutor at the Greek Open University (2004-2017). Xanthoulis is an Ancient Greek lyre soloist and is playing a major part in the instrument's revival.

== Biography ==
Nikos Xanthoulis was born in Larissa, Greece in 1962. He studied trumpet with Anastasios Kypreos at the Athens Conservatory graduating with an “A” Certificate in 1983. He was also awarded the coveted “First Prize” at the conservatory for his achievement on performance examinations. During the same year, he became a member of the European youth Orchestra and played under conductors as Claudio Abbado and Yuri Simonof.

Xanthoulis studied Advanced Theoretical Subjects and Composition in the Athens Conservatory with Menelaos Palandios, Diamantis Diamantopoulos and Pericles Koukos. He received his PhD in Musicology from the Music Academy of Sofia, Bulgaria, for his dissertation on the “Polyphony of 1800”. The Examining Committee, which included Professor Dimiter Christoff, unanimously accepted the thesis—- the first time in 16 years. He also holds a Bachelor in Political Sciences from the Panteion University of Athens. Xanthoulis also studied Harpsichord at the Vignanelli School of Athens, Athenaeum Conservatory with Professor Margarita Dalmati, graduating Cum Laude with the “Ferruccio Vignanello” award. He graduated with a Baccalaureate from Ιωνίδειος Πρότυπος Σχολή, Greece.

As Artistic Consultant with the Greek National Opera, he is in charge of the radio program. He was the principal trumpet player in the Athens Opera for the last twenty-five years, performing as a soloist and member of numerous ensembles throughout Greece. He was also the professor of trumpet at the Athens Conservatory and served as professor at the “Open University” Greece.

After his collaboration with the great actress Anna Synodinou at Epidaurus Festival in 2004, he devoted himself to the revival of the seven-stringed ancient Greek lyre. Since then he developed a complete learning method of the instrument, composed dozens of pieces for the ancient Greek lyre, and rose to prominence as a soloist of the instrument at an international level.

== Career ==
Many concerts featuring performances and compositions by Xanthoulis have been broadcast on Greek and Bulgarian radio programs. "Two children's operas" were premiered by the Athens Opera (1998) and the Messinian Theatre (1999) to critical acclaim and commercial success. Xanthoulis has been invited by four American universities and the Music University of Tien Jin, China, in 2000 and 2001 for recitals and lectures on Greek music from the Antiquity till nowadays.

His investigation and translations on the theory of the ancient Greek music was presented in lecture at the Boston University in 2003 at the Concordia University (Montreal), and in Ottawa. He composed the music for the Aeschylian tragedy “Eumenides”, which was presented in the frame of the Epidaurus Festival (August 2004). He has released three personal CDs and participated in two more CDs (published in Italy and Germany). The KEDROS edition published his symphonic tales “The selfish giant” (Oscar Wilde: book and CD recorded in Montreal) which was a best seller among the children's books in Greece till September 2005 and the "Happy Prince" (2007: book and CD). As a soloist he has performed with many Orchestras and in various Festivals (Ferenc Liszt Orchestra at the Athens Festival, International Festival of Sarajevo, Tashkent Symphony orchestra, Philharmony of Sofia, Tien Jin Symphony Orchestra in China, Thessalonica State Orchestra, Camerata Orchestra, National Symphony Radio Orchestra). Editions “Daedalus- Zacharopoulos” published his treatise on Ancient Greek Music in 2006. Kress Lecturer for 1012-2013 in USA and Canada by the Archaeological Institute of America.

== Main compositions ==
- Concerto for trumpet and orchestra (1995, Editions ORPHEUS)
- Fantasia for trumpet and piano (Editions ORPHEUS, 2005)
- "The tear of the moon "children's opera (Greek National Opera, 1999)
- "The Selfish Giant" children's opera (Kalamata Municipal Theater, 2000)
- "Ismini" of Ghiannis Ritsos for violin and piano (Kalamata Municipal Theater, 2001)
- Fantasia preludio e fuga for piano and strings (Dimitris Papatheodorou (piano), Radio Orchestra of Modern music, Athens, 2002)
- "O Plythintikos Arithmos" on poetry of Kiki Dimoula (Athens, 2002)
- Concerto for 2 guitars and string orchestra (Radio Symphony Orchestra, Stelios and Vassilis, Athens 2003)
- Eumenides of Aeschylus, incidental music (Epidaurus, Herodion, 2004)
- Concerto for 4 horns and symphony orchestra (Athens, 2005)
- "The Happy Prince" (2007) symphonic tale for symphony orchestra, soprano, baryton and narrator
- "The Iliad" (2008)
- Incidental music for "Helen" by Euripides ("Knossos" Theater 2008)
- Incidental music for "Agamemnon" by Aeschylus (Athens Greek Festival, 2009)
- "Helioghenniti" on poetry by Kostis Palamas. Cantata for Bass and Mezzosoprano and orchestra (Academy of Athens, 2009)
- "Poems of Kostas Papageorgiou" (Athens 2010)
- "L' enfant de la mer" French children's opera (2010)
- "The Magic Violin" Opera for "young ears" 2011 (premiere 7 May in the Greek National Opera)
- "L' enfant de la mer 2" French children's opera (2013)
- "Antigone" (in English language) (premiere 2014, New York)
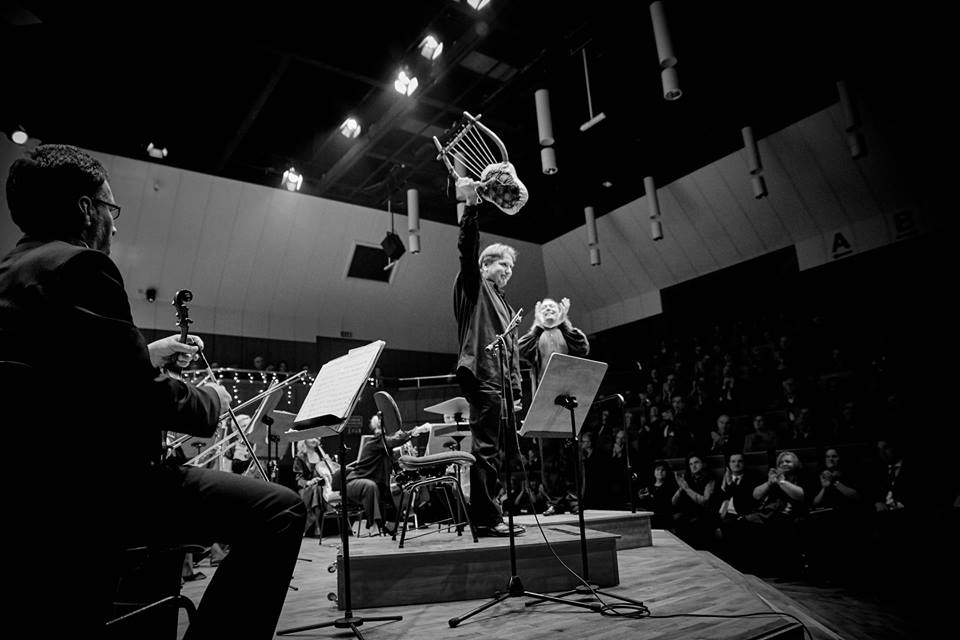
- Dr. Nikos Xanthoulis with the Lower Silesia Philharmonic Symphony Orchestra
  "Concerto for Ancient Greek Lyre and Orchestra" (premiere 2015, Poland)
- "Sonata for Ancient Greek Lyre" (2020, Greece)
- "Rosa Ritrovata" (2022)
- "The Other's Shoes" Musical (2024, Greece)

== Books and Theoretical Treatises ==
- Trumpet Technic (Athens, 1985)
- Prout, Richter and Gedalge three theoreticians of the fugue in the 2nd half of the 19th century. (Doctoral dissertation, Sofia, Bulgaria, 19z93)
- The art of breathing (Athens, 1996)
- Techne Mousikes Cleonides, Aristoxenus, Anonymous Bellerman: The Ancient Greek Music Theory - introduction and translation into modern Greek by Nikos Xanthoulis (Daedalus-Zacharopoulos, Athens 2006)
- Ancient Greek Lyre - Learning method (IWrite Publications, Athens May 2018)
- Complete Method of the Ancient Greek Lyre (Edition Orpheus, Athens September 2021)

== Discography ==
Personal:

- "Works by Greek Composers for Trumpet" (Athens, 1993)
- "The Selfish Giant" a symphonic tale for symphony orchestra, children's choir and two singers (Kedros edition, Athens / Montreal, 2004)
- "O Plythintikos Arithmos" on the poetry of Kiki Dimoula (Artion Records, Athens, 2002)
- "An Anthology of Compositions" (Turangalila Records, Athens, 2003)
- "Happy Prince", a symphonic tale for symphony orchestra, children's choir and two singers (Kedros, Athens, 2007)
- "The Adventures of the Giant Assilaba Dellassy", music tale for string quartet and two singers (Kalendis edition, Greece, 2011)
- "The Magic Violin" (Kalendis edition, Greece, 2013)
- "The Winterhouse" (Kalentis edition, Greece, 2014)
- "Kymothoe's Journey" (Kalentis edition, Greece, 2015)
- "Orpheus's Lyre" (General Music, Greece, 2016)
- "Sappho and her Lyre" (FM Records, Greece 2025)

Collections:

- "Tribute to Astor" (Milano, 2001)
- "Music for Brass" (Agora, 1999)
- "Greek composers for children choir and symphonic orchestra" (Malliaras, 2008)
- "7+1 Composers for Ancient Lyre" (FM Records, Greece, 2024)
