= Hellenic Conservatory =

Music educational institution in Greece

Hellenic Conservatory Ελληνικό Ωδείο

Location
- Didotou 53, Athens; Greece
- Coordinates: 38.05431188506223°N 23.8117836460293°E

Information
- Established: 1919
- Founder: Manolis Kalomiris

The Hellenic Conservatory (Greek: Ελληνικό Ωδείο) is an educational institution for the performing arts in modern Greece. It was founded in Athens in 1919 by the composer Manolis Kalomiris. Kalomoiris was the conservatoire's director until 1926, when he left to found the National Conservatoire. The conservatoire early on opened a number of branches throughout Athens, in a number of cities in Greece, and in Cyprus. The conservatoire's current location is Didotou 53 and its artistic director is Alkis Baltas.

Theodore Antoniou, Leonidas Kavakos and Dimitri Terzakis were students of the Hellenic Conservatory.

== See also ==
- Athens Conservatoire
- National Conservatoire (Greece)
