= National Conservatoire (Greece) =

Music educational institution in Greece

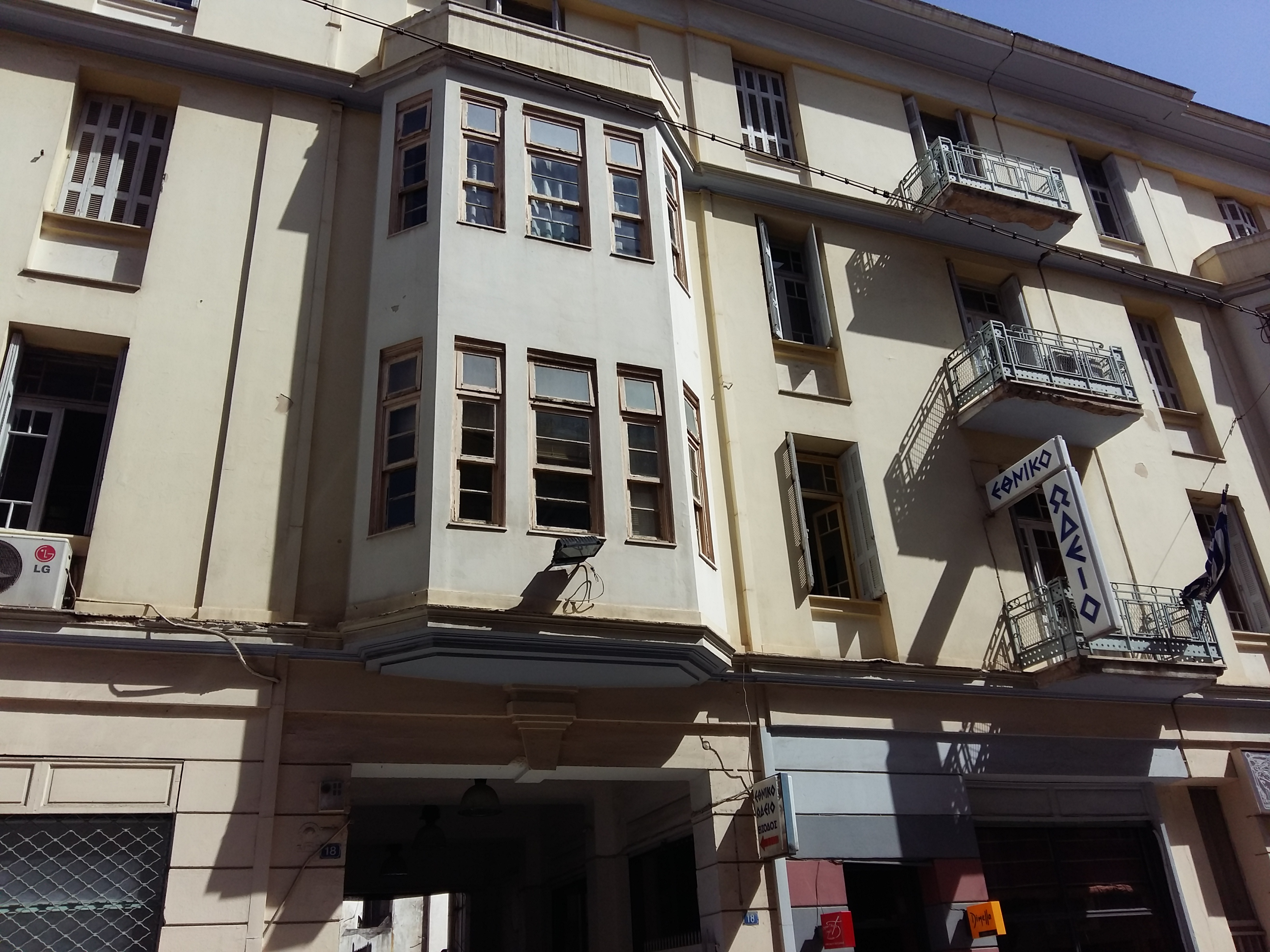
The headquarters of the Greek National Conservatoire, located in Athens

The Greek National Conservatoire (Greek: Εθνικό Ωδείο) was founded in Athens in 1926 by the composer Manolis Kalomiris and notable artists like Charikleia Kalomoiri, Marika Kotopouli, Dionysios Lavrangas, and Sophia Spanoudi. For some time the conservatoire was the only Greek educational and cultural organization to approach international Greek community by opening branches in Egypt and Cyprus (1948). Over the years, many well-known artists cooperated with the conservatoire, such as Maria Callas, Gabriel Pierné, Dimitris Mitropoulos, and Avra Theodoropoulou. Among the conservatoire's students were Maria Callas, Leonidas Kavakos, Agnes Baltsa, and Manto. When the Greek National Opera was founded in 1940, two thirds of its resident staff were graduating students or graduates of the sources National Conservatoire.

The premises of National Conservatoire have moved around Athens over its lifetime. From its initial location in Irakleitou 6, it moved to Dorou 3 (1932), Solomou and G. Septemvriou (1935), and Solomou 67 and Aristotelous (1940). As of 2006, its location is Maizonos 8 and its artistic director is Periklis Koukos.

== Higher School of Dramatic Arts ==
The Higher School of Dramatic Arts was founded as a Department of Theatrical Studies of the Greek National Conservatoire, in Athens in 1926 and recognized by the Greek state in 1959.

Lessons: Dramatic Art (Narrative Pantomime, Miming/mimetic mode - training methods, improvisation, vocal projection, scene-work, audition techniques), History and philosophy of theatre, History of Neo-Hellenic Literature, General History of Arts, Aesthetic, Dance-rhythmic art, Music-singing-soundtrack, Theatre costume design, Theatrical makeup.

== See also ==
- Athens Conservatoire
- Hellenic Conservatory
