= Manolis Kalomiris =

Greek classical composer

Manolis Kalomiris

Manolis Kalomiris (Greek: Μανώλης Καλομοίρης; December 14, 1883 – April 3, 1962) was a Greek classical composer. He was the founder of the Greek National School of Music.

== Biography ==
Born in Smyrna, Ottoman Empire (modern Izmir, Turkey), he attended school in Constantinople and studied piano and composition in Vienna. After working for a few years as a piano teacher in Kharkov, Russian Empire, he settled in Athens. An admirer of Richard Wagner, Rimsky-Korsakoff, Kostis Palamas, and Nikos Kazantzakis, he set himself the life goal of establishing a Greek "national school" of music, based on the ideas of the Russian national composers, on western musical achievements and on modern Greek folk music, poetry and myth. He thus founded in 1919 the Hellenic Conservatory and in 1926 the National Conservatoire. At the same time, he served as the General Supervisor of military bands in the country. He wrote three symphonies and five operas, one piano concerto and one violin concertino, other symphonic works, chamber music and numerous songs and piano works. He held various public posts and was elected member of the Academy of Athens.

He died in 1962 in Athens.
