= Athens State Orchestra =

- Orchestra
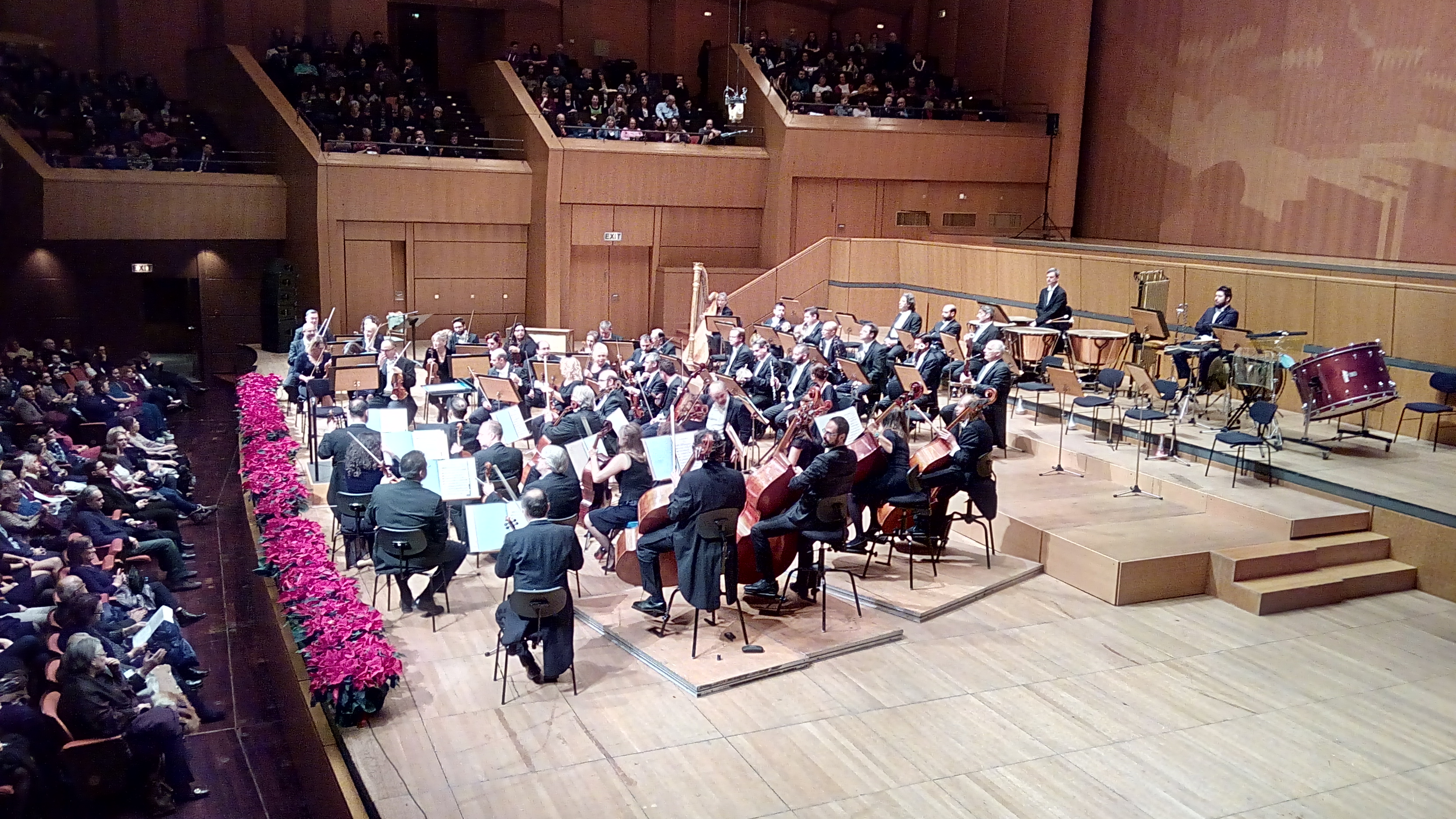
- Native name: Κρατική Ορχήστρα Αθηνών
- Founded: December 11, 1942; 82 years ago
- Location: Athens, Greece
- Concert hall: Athens Concert Hall
- Principal conductor: Lukas Karytinos
- Website: www.koa.gr

The Athens State Orchestra (Greek: Κρατική Ορχήστρα Αθηνών, romanized: Kratiki Orchistra Athinon) is a Greek symphony orchestra based in Athens, which is consistently ranked in the top handful of orchestras of the country.

== Principal conductors ==
- Filoktitis Εkonomidis (1942–1957)
- Theodoros Vavagiannis (1957–1969)
- Andreas Paridis (1969–1975)
- Manos Hadjidakis (1976–1982)
- Yannis Ioannidis (1983–1989)
- Alexandros Symeonidis (1989–1995)
- Aris Garoufalis (1995–2004)
- Byron Fidetzis (2004–2011)
- Vassilis Christopoulos (2011–2014)
- Stefanos Tsialis (2014–2020)
- Lukas Karytinos (2020– )
