= Theodore Antoniou =

Greek composer and conductor

Theodore Antoniou (Greek: Θεόδωρος Αντωνίου, Theódoros Andoníou; February 10, 1935 – December 26, 2018), was a Greek composer and conductor. His works vary from operas and choral works to chamber music, from film and theatre music to solo instrumental works. In addition to his career as composer and conductor, he was professor of composition at Boston University. His education included studies in violin, voice, and composition at the National Conservatory of Athens, the Hellenic Conservatory, and conducting at both The Hochschule für Musik and the International Music Centre in Darmstadt. He was a member of the Academy of Athens.

In 2004, he was awarded the Herder Prize from the Alfred Toepfer Stiftung F.V.S.

== Career ==
Antoniou was born in Athens, Greece. He held teaching positions at Stanford University, the University of Utah, and the Philadelphia Musical Academy. He was professor among the composition staff at Boston University, where he served since 1978. He also led and conducted the new music ensemble Alea III, which holds residence at Boston University. The ensemble performs frequently with new and premiering compositions, has worked with numerous renowned artists, and has toured Europe on numerous occasions.

As a conductor, Antoniou worked with orchestras, small and large ensembles, and musical organizations all over the globe. He was engaged by several major orchestras and ensembles, such as the Boston Symphony Orchestra Chamber Players, the Radio Orchestras of Berlin and Paris, the Bavarian Radio Orchestra, the Tonhalle Orchestra (Zurich), the National Opera of Greece, and the Berkshire Music Center Orchestra. In 1974 he was engaged as assistant director of contemporary activities at the Tanglewood Music Center in Lenox, Massachusetts, and held that position until the summer of 1985. As an enthusiast and performer of new music, Antoniou founded various contemporary music ensembles, including ALEA II at Stanford University; ALEA III, at Boston University; the Philadelphia New Music Group; and the Hellenic Group of Contemporary Music. He also directed the ALEA III International Composition Competition. Furthermore, he held the position of president of the National Greek Composers' Association and director of the Experimental Stage of National Opera of Greece since 1989. In 1995 he was the Member of International Honorary Committee of the Worldwide Dictionary of Music (Editor: Olympia Tolika) of European Art Center of Greece. On July 11, 1996, his Kommos B - Morton Gould in Memoriam, had its world premiere when performed at the Naumburg Orchestral Concerts, in the Naumburg Bandshell, Central Park, in the summer series.

As a composer, Antoniou wrote more than a hundred and fifty compositions for theatre and film music. He has been trained under esteemed composers such as Günter Bialas and Yiannis Papaioannou. Many of Antoniou's compositions were commissioned by major orchestras around the world. Over two hundred of his works have been published by Bärenreiter Verlag (Germany), G. Schirmer (USA) and Philippos Nakas (Greece).

In terms of style, Antoniou's earlier works hesitated at first between a simple atonality and Bartókian folklorism. He later developed serial techniques and applied them in various refined forms, which continue to characterize his works. In the 1970s, the influences of Jani Christou, Bernd Alois Zimmermann, and Krzysztof Penderecki became evident in his works.

Antoniou died in Athens on December 26, 2018.

== Major works ==
=== Orchestral ===
- Celebration (1994) – 12 minutes
- The GBYSO Music (1982) – 16 minutes
- Paean (1989) – 8 minutes
- Skolion (1986) – 15 minutes

=== Soloist(s) and orchestra ===
- Concerto for Piano and Orchestra (1998) – 25 minutes
- Concerto for Guitar and Orchestra (1996/1997)
- Concerto for Violin and Strings (Version II)—“Cadenza for Leonidas” (1995) – 22 minutes
- Concerto/Fantasia (1989) – 18 minutes
- Eleven Aphighisis (Narrations) (1983) – 25 minutes
- North/South (1990) – 11 minutes

=== Large ensemble (7 or more players) ===
- Dexiotechniká Idiómela (1989) – 12 minutes
- Ertnos (1986) – 17 minutes
- Concertino for Piano, Percussion & Strings, Op.#16b (1962)

=== Soloist(s) and large ensemble (7 or more players) ===
- Celebration VI (1996)
- Crete: The Great Dream (1984) – 16 minutes
- Epigrams (1981) – 16 minutes

=== Works for 2–6 players ===
- Aphierosis (Dedication) (1984) – 8 minute(s)

=== Chorus and orchestra/ensemble ===
- Celebration III (1995) – 9 minutes
- Eros I (1990) – 15 minutes
- Oraseis Opsonde (1988) – 12 minutes
- Prometheus (1983) – 27 minutes

== Recordings ==
- Impressions for Saxophone and Orchestra:Virtuosic Works by 20th Century Greek Composers (including Concerto piccolo by Antoniou, as well as Theodorakis, Skalkottas, Alexiadis, Tenidis, and Hadjidakis) Thessaloniki State Symphony Orchestra, conducted by Myron Michailidis, 2005–2006 Naxos

== Interviews ==
Θόδωρος Αντωνίου (1935-2018): "Η πρόκληση της μουσικής δημιουργίας", Athens, 1994.
