= Haris Xanthoudakis =

Greek composer (1950–2023)

Haris Xanthoudakis (Greek: Χάρης Ξανθουδάκης; 18 June 1950 – 7 November 2023) was a Greek composer.

A native of Piraeus, Xanthoudakis studied with Iannis Xenakis, among others. Besides music, he has worked in the fields of philology, glottology, semiotics, and art history. Xanthoudakis taught in various conservatories around Europe before becoming, in 1992, professor of music at the Ionian University on Corfu.

Haris Xanthoudakis died on 7 November 2023, at the age of 73.

== Discography ==
Agora Records has released Xanthoudakis' Terra Dove as part of its survey of Greek orchestral music recorded by the Carlsbad Symphony Orchestra under Byron Fidetzis.

== Sources ==
Agora Records, Music of Alexiadis/Dragatakis/Haliassas/Koukos/Maragopulos/Xanthoudakis/Zannas, CD
