= Thessaloniki Concert Hall =

Venue in Thessaloniki, Greece

Thessaloniki Concert Hall Μέγαρο Μουσικής Θεσσαλονίκης
- Interactive map of the Thessaloniki Concert Hall; Μέγαρο Μουσικής Θεσσαλονίκης area

General information
- Location: Maria Callas Street, Thessaloniki, Greece
- Coordinates: 40°35′54″N 22°56′54″E
- Inaugurated: 2 January 2000
- Cost: € 41 million

Other information
- Seating capacity: 1400

Website
- Homepage

Thessaloniki Concert Hall (Greek: Μέγαρο Μουσικής Θεσσαλονίκης) is a centre for the performing arts in Thessaloniki, Greece. It opened in 2000 on land donated by the Greek state. The complex has two main buildings: M1, with an auditorium that seats 1400; and M2, in more contemporary style by Japanese architect Arata Isozaki, with a number of smaller performance spaces. It hosts a range of events, including concerts, opera and conferences, alongside educational and outreach activities.

Artistic director of the Thessaloniki Concert Hall, whose three-year term begins on January 1, 2021, is Christos Galileas, associate professor of violin at Georgia State University.

View from the promenade

== See also ==
- Municipal Theatre of Corfu
- Athens Concert Hall
- List of concert halls
