= The Duenna (Gerhard opera) =

The Duenna (La Dueña) is an English/German-language opera in three acts composed by Robert Gerhard to libretto by the composer, after the 1775 comedy The Duenna by Richard Brinsley Sheridan. Composed from 1945 to 1947, the opera was premiered on BBC radio in 1949, conducted by Stanford Robinson and was received well. It was revised in 1951 for performance at the ISCM Festival in Wiesbaden, but there the use of popular melodies did not go down well with critics. The opera is in part atonal, following Gerhard's teacher Schoenberg. Gerhard was wounded deeply "when it was heard by an audience unlikely to be put off by its occasional modernisms" it was coolly received, "because Gerhard the pupil of Schoenberg seemed to be wasting his time on light music". Grove notes that "it unfolds as a series of set pieces... related to... Spanish folk music" and represents "Gerhard's last extended look at his Spanish inheritance..."

== Performance history ==
A BBC broadcast in February 1949 was conducted by Stanford Robinson, with Joan Cross in the title role, Victoria Sladen and Peter Pears, Doris Gambell and Denis Dowling as two sets of lovers: Arnold Matters as Isaac, and Parry Jones as Father Paul. Due to a planned staging at Weisbaden being cancelled it was given in concert at Weisbaden Opera during the twenty-fifth Festival of the I.S.C.M (22 June 22 to 1 July 1951) conducted by Franz-Paul Decker.

It was staged, in English, in 1992 at Teatro Lirico Nacional, Madrid, conducted by Antoni Ros-Marbà and Gran Teatre del Liceu, Barcelona. In September 1992 Opera North gave the British stage premiere again conducted by Ros-Marbà and in the performing edition by David Drew, with Gillian Knight in the title role and Susan Chilcott, Andrew Shore and Pamela Helen Stephen among the cast; it was not recorded.

The Bielefeld Opera, under conductor Geoffrey Moull, presented the work in 1994.

== Roles ==
| Role | Voice | 1992 Premiere |
|---|---|---|
| Conductor | | Antoni Ros-Marbà |
| Don Jerome | Bass | Richard Van Allan |
| Don Ferdinand | Baritone | Anthony Michaels-Moore |
| Donna Luisa | Soprano | |
| The Duenna | Mezzo-soprano | Felicity Palmer |
| Don Antonio | Tenor | David Rendall |
| Donna Clara D'almanza | Mezzo-soprano | |
| Don Isaac | Baritone | Enrique Baqucrizo |
| Father Paul | Tenor | |
| Lopez | Speaking role | |
| Brethren of Deadly Sin | Tenor/high-baritone | |
| Ladies and Gentlemen of Fashion, Townspeople, Beggars | SATB chorus | |
| Gypsy | Soprano | |
| Don Antonio's servant | Speaking role | |
| Donna Luisa's maid | Speaking role | |
| Strumpet, Cavalier, Bawd, Two Beaux, Friars, Wench, Cardinal and priests, Lady in a Sedan Chair, Dancers and players, Gypsy children | Comprimario | |

== Plot ==
Location: Seville, Spain

Date: 18th century

Time: Between dawn and evening

=== Act 1 ===
Merchant Don Jerome plans to marry his daughter Luisa to affluent Portuguese Jew Don Isaac, driving away her true love Don Antonio due to his meagre financial state. Donna Clara, the love of Luisa's brother Ferdinand, has fled her home to escape her stepmother. Luisa conspires with her Duenna to fool her father. They trade clothes and push her father to get rid of the Duenna and imprison Luisa, thereby allowing the real Luisa to search for Ferdinand, allowing Duenna to capture Isaac as her lover.

=== Act 2 ===
Luisa meets the runaway Clara on her search. She reaches out to Isaac for help by pretending to be Clara who is now in love with Antonio. Isaac agrees to bring Antonio to her. His relationship with the masked Luisa improves when she says that marriage is only possible if they elope. The real Luisa, now in the home of Isaac, meets Antonio and becomes ecstatic when he agrees to be in a relationship with her.

=== Act 3 ===
Ferdinand believes that Antonio is giving up on Clara but soon both couples are happily married. All the plots are revealed before the duped Don Jerome.

== Recording ==
- La Dueña (The Duenna) (Chandos, 2013, CHAN9520-21) recorded in the Royal Concert Hall, Nottingham in 1996, with Richard Van Allan as Don Jerome, Adrian Clarke as Don Ferdinand, Susannah Glanville as Donna Luisa, Claire Powell as the Duenna, Neill Archer as Don Antonio, and the Opera North Chorus and English Northern Philharmonia conducted by Antoni Ros-Marbà.
