= Antonio Brosa =

Spanish violinist (1894–1979)

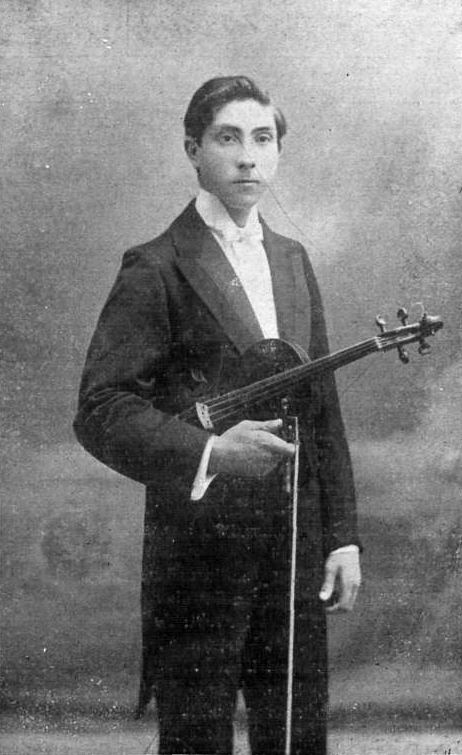
Antonio Brosa

Antonio Brosa (27 June 1894 – 23 March 1979) was a Spanish violinist, mostly active in the UK.

== Life ==
Born in La Canonja in Catalonia, Brosa began studying the violin at the age of four with his father, making his public debut at the age of 10 in Barcelona. He studied with Mathieu Crickboom in Brussels, and made his debut in London in 1919, aged 25, and his first tour of the US in 1930.

Brosa was the soloist for the premiere performance of the young Elizabeth Poston's Violin Sonata, broadcast by the BBC on 9 July 1928, for Haydn Wood's Violin Concerto on 1 March 1933, with the BBC Symphony Orchestra, conducted by Joseph Lewis, and also for the first performance of Arthur Benjamin's Violin Concerto (1932) on 5 January 1934 with the BBC Symphony Orchestra, conducted by Adrian Boult.

In the summer of 1938 William Walton asked Brosa to look over and suggest improvements for the first two movements of his Violin Concerto, which he was writing for Jascha Heifetz.

He was introduced to Benjamin Britten by Frank Bridge (Britten's teacher) and the two became great friends. Britten played his Suite for Violin and Piano with Brosa at the International Society for Contemporary Music Festival held in Barcelona in 1936. In 1940, Britten consulted Brosa on the difficulties of his Violin Concerto. Brosa gave the first performance of the concerto at Carnegie Hall on 28 March 1940, playing on his Vesuvius Stradivarius of 1727 with the New York Philharmonic, conducted by John Barbirolli. This performance launched his career as an international soloist. However, Britten later took out many of Brosa's virtuosic embellishments as they were no longer to his liking.

Brosa was also the soloist for the premieres of Helen Perkin's Spring Rhapsody in 1937, Denis ApIvor's Violin Sonata, Op. 9, in 1947, of Roberto Gerhard's Violin Concerto at the Florence Maggio Musicale in 1950, and of Stanley Bate's Violin Concerto No. 3, Op. 58, at the Royal Festival Hall on 11 June 1953.

Brosa taught violin at the Royal College of Music and was the leader of the Brosa String Quartet, founded in 1924, with Hyam Greenbaum (violin), Leonard Rubens (viola) and Anthony Pini (cello). The quartet made its US debut in New York on 20 October 1930, appearing with pianist Harriet Cohen. He disbanded this quartet in 1939. He was also the leader of the Pro Arte Quartet in the US, and in the UK worked in partnership with pianist and teacher Kathleen Long between 1948 and 1966. Brosa was fluent in five languages. His 'Vesuvius' Stradivari violin later belonged to Remo Lauricella, the UK based concert violinist/composer.

Brosa died in Barcelona, aged 84.
