= Doming =

Doming may refer to:

- Doming (television), defect found on some cathode ray tube televisions
- Doming, also called sinking or dapping, a metalworking technique
- Doming, geologic process
- Doming (printing), technique to apply a 3D effect to a 2D Surface
- Doming Lam, Hong Kong musician and composer
