= ISCM World Music Days =

Contemporary music festival

- Genre: Contemporary music
- Location: worldwide
- Years active: 1922–present
- Organizer: International Society for Contemporary Music
- Website: http://www.iscm.org

The ISCM World Music Days is an annual contemporary music festival organized by the International Society for Contemporary Music, originally created in 1923 as the ISCM Festival as a means to support the most advanced composition tendencies. Each edition is held in a different location, and the programmes are organized by a jury after evaluating the submissions of each ISCM national section.

== Editions ==
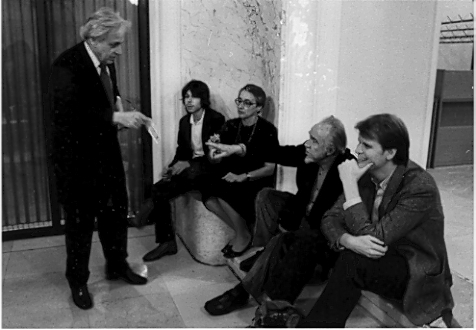
György, Lukas and Vera Ligeti, Conlon Nancarrow and Michael Daugherty (l.t.r.) at the 1982 ISCM World Music Days in Graz, Austria

| Year | Venue |
|---|---|
| 1923 | (Austria) Salzburg |
| 1924 | (Czech Republic) Prague and (Austria) Salzburg |
| 1925 | (Czech Republic) Prague and (Italy) Venice |
| 1926 | (Switzerland) Zürich |
| 1927 | (Germany) Frankfurt |
| 1928 | (Italy) Siena |
| 1929 | (Switzerland) Geneva |
| 1930 | (Belgium) Liège and Brussels |
| 1931 | (United Kingdom) Oxford and London |
| 1932 | (Austria) Vienna |
| 1933 | (Netherlands) Amsterdam |
| 1935 | (Italy) Florence |
| 1936 | (Spain) Barcelona |
| 1937 | (France) Paris |
| 1938 | (United Kingdom) London |
| 1939 | (Poland) Warsaw and Kraków |
| 1941 | (United States) New York City (abbreviated festival) |
| 1942 | (United States) Berkeley, California (abbreviated festival) |
| 1946 | (United Kingdom) London |
| 1947 | (Netherlands) Amsterdam |
| 1948 | (Italy) Palermo and Taormina |
| 1950 | (Belgium) Brussels |
| 1951 | (West Germany) Frankfurt |
| 1952 | (Austria) Salzburg |
| 1953 | (Norway) Oslo |
| 1954 | (Israel) Haifa |
| 1955 | (West Germany) Baden-Baden |
| 1956 | (Sweden) Stockholm |
| 1957 | (Switzerland) Zürich |
| 1958 | (France) Strasbourg |
| 1959 | (Italy) Rome |

| Year | Venue |
|---|---|
| 1960 | (Germany) Cologne |
| 1961 | (Austria) Vienna |
| 1962 | (United Kingdom) London |
| 1963 | (Netherlands) Amsterdam |
| 1964 | (Denmark) Copenhague |
| 1965 | (Spain) Madrid |
| 1966 | (Sweden) Stockholm |
| 1967 | (Czechoslovakia) Prague |
| 1968 | (Poland) Warsaw |
| 1969 | (West Germany) Hamburg |
| 1970 | (Switzerland) Basel |
| 1971 | (United Kingdom) London |
| 1972 | (Austria) Graz |
| 1973 | (Iceland) Reykjavík |
| 1974 | (Netherlands) Rotterdam |
| 1975 | (France) Paris |
| 1976 | (United States) Boston |
| 1977 | (West Germany) Bonn |
| 1978 | (Sweden) Stockholm and (Finland) Helsinki |
| 1979 | (Greece) Athens |
| 1980 | (Israel) Tel Aviv |
| 1981 | (Belgium) Brussels |
| 1982 | (Austria) Graz |
| 1983 | (Denmark) Aarhus |
| 1984 | (Canada) Toronto and Montreal |
| 1985 | Netherlands |
| 1986 | (Hungary) Budapest |
| 1987 | (West Germany) Cologne, Bonn and Frankfurt |
| 1988 | Hong Kong |
| 1989 | (Netherlands) Amsterdam |
| 1990 | (Switzerland) Zürich |
| 1991 | (Norway) Oslo |
| 1992 | (Poland) Warsaw |
| 1993 | Mexico City |
| 1994 | (Sweden) Stockholm |
| 1995 | (Germany) Ruhr |

| Year | Venue |
|---|---|
| 1996 | (Denmark) Copenhagen |
| 1997 | (South Korea) Seoul |
| 1998 | (United Kingdom) Manchester |
| 1999 | Romania and Moldova |
| 2000 | Luxembourg |
| 2001 | (Japan) Yokohama |
| 2002 | Hong Kong |
| 2003 | (Slovenia) Ljubljana |
| 2004 | Switzerland |
| 2005 | (Croatia) Zagreb |
| 2006 | (Germany) Stuttgart |
| 2007 | Hong Kong |
| 2008 | (Lithuania) Vilnius |
| 2009 | (Sweden) Visby, Växjö and Gothenburg |
| 2010 | (Australia) Sydney |
| 2011 | (Croatia) Zagreb |
| 2012 | (Belgium) Antwerp, Bruges, Brussels, Ghent, Leuven and Mons |
| 2013 | (Slovakia) Košice, Bratislava and (Austria) Vienna |
| 2014 | (Poland) Wrocław |
| 2015 | Slovenia |
| 2016 | (South Korea) Tongyeong |
| 2017 | (Canada) Vancouver |
| 2018 | (China) Beijing |
| 2019 | (Estonia) Tallinn |
| 2020 | (New Zealand) Auckland and Christchurch (rescheduled to 2022 to the COVID-19 pandemic) |
| 2021 | (China) Shanghai and Nanning (cancelled due to COVID-19 travel restrictions) |
| 2022 | (New Zealand) Auckland and Christchurch |
| 2023 | South Africa |
| 2024 | Faroe Islands |
| 2025 | Portugal |
| 2026 | Romania |

| Year | Venue |
