= String Quartet No. 1 (Gerhard) =

String quartet composed by Robert Gerhard

- by Robert Gerhard
- Year: 1951–1955
- Dedication: Parrenin Quartet
- Duration: 20 minutes
- Movements: -I: Allegro assai -II: Con vivacità -III: Grave -IV: Molto allegro

Premiere
- Date: August 1956
- Location: Dartington Summer School

The String Quartet No.1 is a piece for two violins, viola and cello, composed by Robert Gerhard between 1951 and 1955, premiered at Dartington in 1956. This work marks a turning point in Gerhard's style and composition processes, because in one hand, he recovers some old techniques such as the sonata form in the first movement, along with others not as old like the 12-tone technique. Gerhard brilliantly develops, combines and transforms these resources along with new systematic processes created by himself, so that it leads to a new and broad theoretical framework that will be essential to his music thereafter.

== Background ==
Robert Gerhard began writing this string quartet in 1951 in Cambridge, where he lived in exile since 1939 as a result of Franco's dictatorship, within a significant historical and personal context. He had been one of the most important disciples (from the few who remained alive) of Arnold Schoenberg, who died in the same year of 1951. At the same moment, the twelve-tone compositional technique of the avant-garde in the interwar period defended by Schoenberg was replaced by integral serialism, led by Pierre Boulez.

Shortly before, two of Gerhard's last pieces were poorly received by critics. The first one, the opera The Duenna, released abroad, was rejected for "abusing popular melodies", which may not have happened if the premiere had been in Barcelona. There, the public could have been more involved in the plot and its references to politics and society. The second piece, Sonata for viola and piano, is said to have been "lacking originality". This led Gerhard to a period of crisis. At this point he is witnessing a second great shock in the world of musical composition, after the first step towards the twelve-tone system, at the end of the First World War.

Afterwards, he began a third stage of his compositional career, characterized by an exploration of the concept of serialism, but in a very different direction from that of Boulez or Messiaen. From then on, he applies the concept of serialization to pitch and temporalities, but in a more lax way: he does not necessarily make use of the entire chromatic scale, and also makes some block exchanges within a single series, leaving more room for expressiveness. He also develops serialism in terms of time, based on the concept of time-seven: Gerhard is inclined to orient himself towards proportions (rather than rhythm) and the distance between events (so that articulation, rhythm, duration, metric and form, are included in the same spectrum).

However, despite the criticisms and his predilection for this new serialism, Gerhard was never opposed to use elements from the Catalan folk music in aspects such as rhythm, orchestration or in the shape of the tone-rows. From this moment on, he also took over from Schoenberg in the didactic field of 12-tone teaching, giving lectures and writing articles.

In this sense, he shares with Bartók the will of transforming the tradition to maintain it. In fact, the esthetic evoked by some of the pieces of this creative new period by Gerhard, such as the Piano Concerto (1951) or the Harpsichord Concerto (1956), denote to some extent, a clear influence of the Hungarian composer. In addition to this, by comparing aspects such as form, rhythm, modes or coloration, one can clearly see the existence of similarities in the use of folk music from the respective regions of each of the composers.

Two years later, the premiere of the Symphony No. 1 (1953) had a considerable success, at the Festival of the International Society of Contemporary Music in Baden-Baden. Despite Gerhard didn't follow the other new musical currents, he was well aware of the work of the new generations of British composers and, in general, of the international scene. Within this situation there are a couple of exceptions: on one hand, during the 1950s he wrote instrumental music for BBC series (using the pseudonym "Joan de Serrallonga"); on the other hand, he researched and experimented with electronic music (particularly concrete music), obtaining resources and materials that would later give rise to his electro-acoustic compositions. In this task, Leopoldina Feichtegger played an important role (Poldi, married to Gerhard). And it could also be said that they would hardly have achieved all this progress without the patronage of Alice Roughton, who offered jobs and housing to the marriage: Alice's residence was an important place of assistance and reunion between intellectuals of the time.

An important fact about the string quartet No. 1 is that actually it was not the first quartet he composed, as he had previously written 3 more, but Gerhard ended up dismissing the idea of incorporating this others into his catalog. The first two date from 1917 (being a pupil of Felip Pedrell) and 1922 (self-taught) respectively. The third has a more complex history: he composed it in 1927, while he was Schoenberg's student, but it is discussed whether it was really a work he presented to the professor of the Akademie der Künste or not, as it differs stylistically from the rest of his works. However, a part of the material of this latter quartet appears in the Concertino for Strings (1929). In addition, two years before his return to Catalonia in 1929, he presented this quartet to a composition competition in Barcelona, to get a boost in his career in terms of recognition and economic autonomy.

== Analysis ==
This work is written in four movements, and has an approximate duration of 20 minutes (19 in the premiere and 23 in the recording of the Kreutzer Quartet, of which the durations below are noted):

- First movement: Allegro assai (7'11")
- Second movement: Con vivacità (2'35")
- Third movement: Grave (5'24")
- Fourth movement: Molto allegro (8'34")

The temporal difference between the beginning of the compositional process of the work and the end, although based on the same twelve-note sequence, creates a stylistic separation between movements 1–2 and 3–4. The last two movements are one of the first explorations of the "Combinatory Code" that relates heights and proportions through series.

"[I] employ simultaneously with the 12-note series, a set of numerically expressed proportions. This series can be thought of as a code for the combinatoric calculations that deal with the height-structure relationship." Robert Gerhard, Developments in Twelve-Tone Technique (1956)

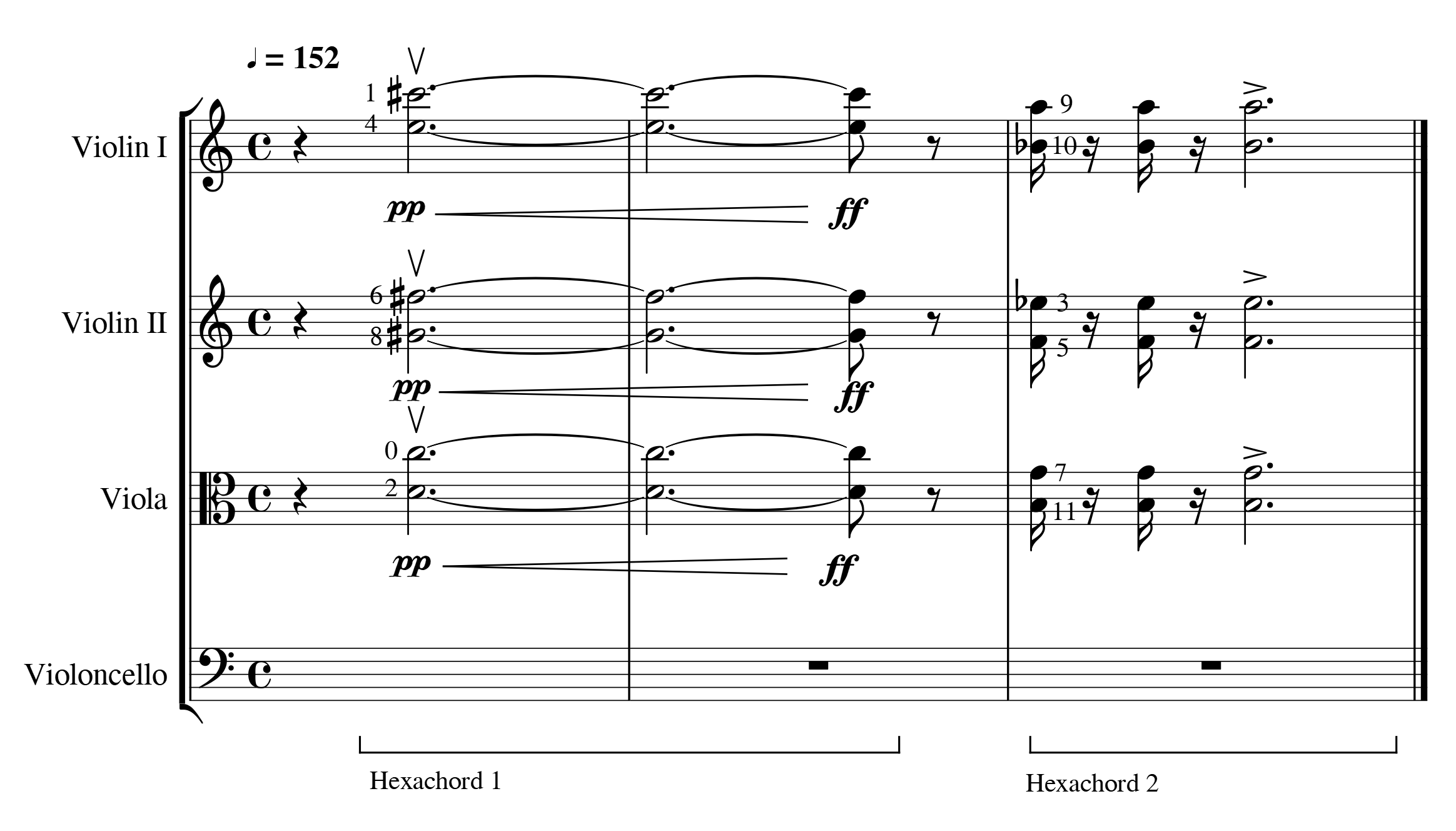
Figure 1. Appearance of two complementary hexachords at the beginning of the piece

In addition, incidentally, one can notice that the golden ratio is implicit in the duration of the last movements: this may vary depending on the recording, but we can see that the ratio between the fourth and third movement is approaching, as well as the total of the recording between the last two movements.

=== Analysis of the movements ===
==== Moviment I (Allegro assai) ====
Gerhard worked hard to reinvent the application of the sonata form by mixing it with the stylistic resources that he uses in his compositions, and this movement is a clear example of this. However, outside tonality, it was necessary to define new musical processes that would allow structuring a sonata within thematic and harmonic parameters. Because the thematic element is preserved within the twelve-tone ideology, it is not necessary to change the technique in this regard beyond the use of the kind of melodic lines of its own. As for harmony and the lack of tonality, he divides the tone-row of heights into two Hexachords and uses this duality to achieve the harmonic contrast that previously was marked by ancient modes and tonalities. Hexachords are a resource Schoenberg had used before, and Gerhard is known to have spent some time studying his master's compositions such as Von Heute auf Morgen.

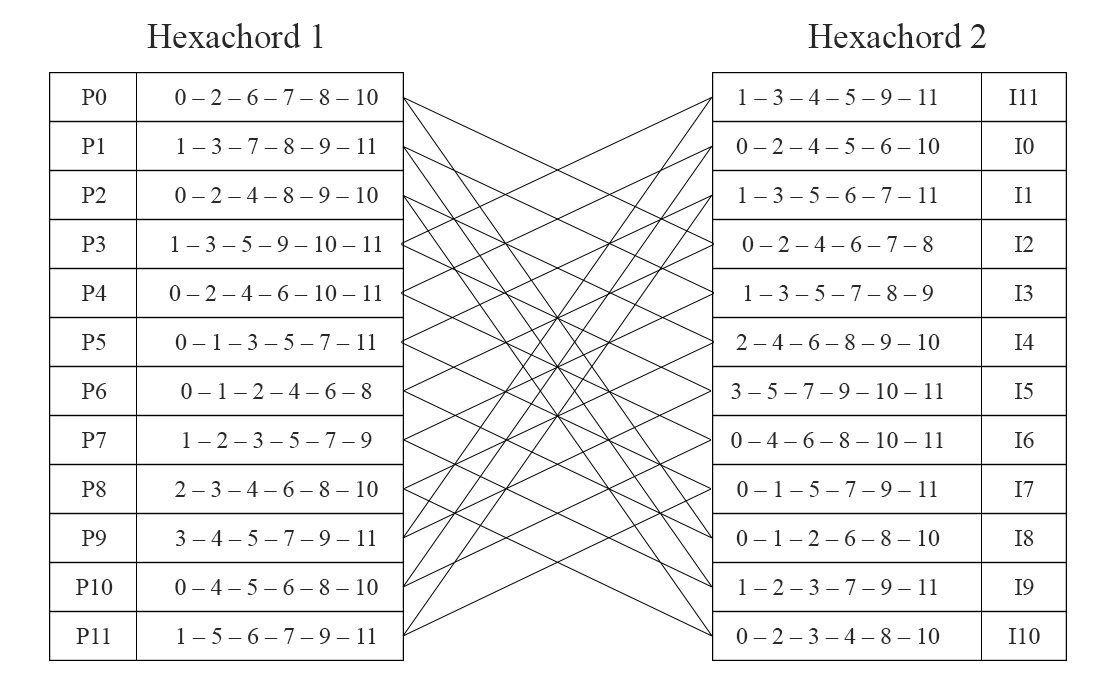
Figure 2. Every possible hexachord, "closely" related to their inversions by means of the 12-tone series of the first movement

The division of the tone-row into these two complementary hexachords at the beginning of the quartet predisposes the importance that the hexachordal relationship plays in this work. In addition to this, each hexachord in the original series is part of the SC 6–22 (012468), which is complementary in itself. As a result, each hexachord, either extracted from the beginning or the end of the row, is related by its transposition and retrograded inversion. Gerhard takes this a step further by choosing to relate hexachordal tone-rows that share five pitch classes in common. This means that for each hexachordal row there will be two other hexachords that share five pitch classes among each other. Since Gerhard exploits these relationships exclusively quartet, we will refer to hexachords who manifest this relationship as "closely" related.

While each hexachord in its prime form has only one related companion who shares the six pitch classes, there are two hexachordal transformations for each of the related six-note segments. This ladder-shaped relationship can be seen in Figure 2, which features a "hexachordal matrix", where each prime shape of the series is reordered from lowest to highest (from the order of pitch class) within its two hexachordal limits. Lines drawn from each hexachord to the other are paired with their nearest relative.

Due to this relationship, Gerhard can move perfectly between multiple transformations of the series keeping at least five notes in common between each hexachord, resulting in clear and uninterrupted harmonic coherence.

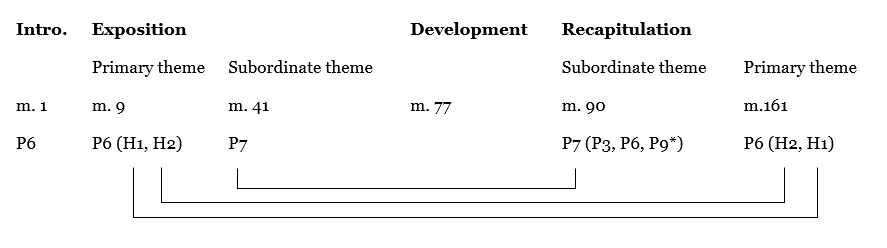
Figure 3. The distribution of hexachords along the piece's structure, draws similarities with the sonata form

Regarding the use of these hexachords in the themes, he develops the relationships between these two structures, using retrogrades and inversions to develop the areas that correspond to exposition, development, recapitulation, and primary and subordinate themes. Thus, for example, he can only present one hexachord (with its respective transpositions) in the exposition, and reserve certain combinations of transpositions for occurrences of very specific motifs. The following schema refers to the association of these traditional segmentations and how Gerhard implements series transpositions and hexachords (encoded with P and H respectively).

This new perspective of the harmonic structure is largely consistent with Babbitt's thinking, that the fundamental idea of 12-tone technique is a reformulation of the principle of tonality. In fact, it is inferred in Gerhard's writings that he was very much aware of Babbit's research.

In addition, this first movement features "echoes of primitive Iberian rhythms". Specifically, some of the polyrhythms in the ostinato refer to the Charradas of Salamanca, and at some rate, to the Fandango.

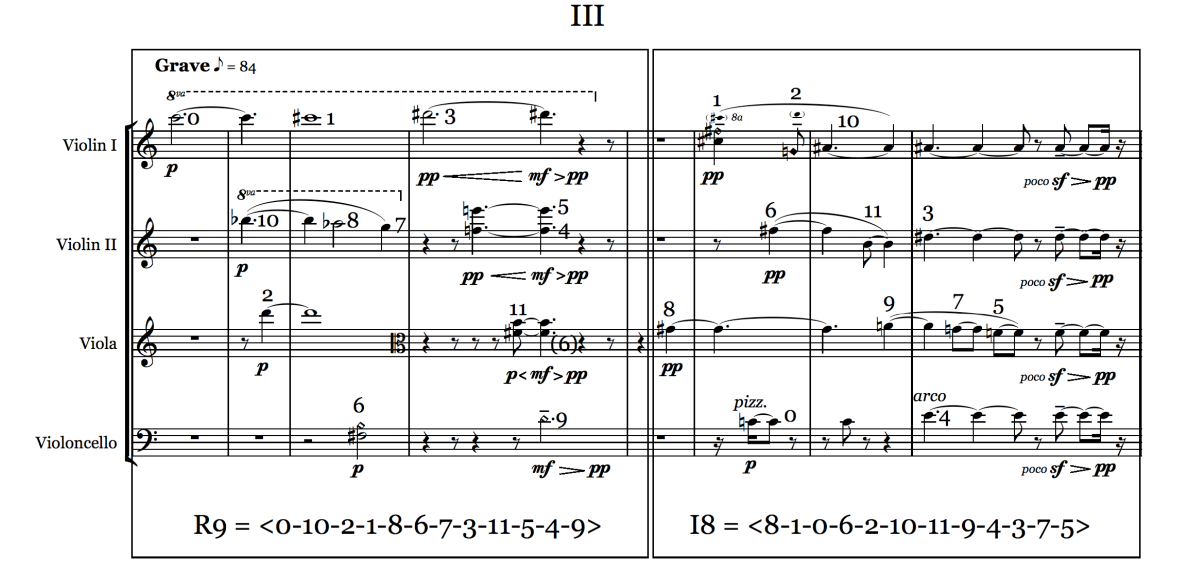
Figure 4. Pairing of two series related by inversion and retrogradation

==== Second movement (Con vivacità) ====
In this movement he takes advantage of the hexachords to establish a link between the transformations of the tone-row and its inversions. In this way, on one hand he pairs each transposition of the original sequence, with its retrograde and, on the other, with another inversion and its respective retrogradation.

==== Third movement (Grave) ====
In this movement he takes advantage of the hexachords to establish a link between the transformations of the tone-row and its inversions. In this way, on one hand he pairs each transposition of the original sequence, with its retrograde and, on the other, with another inversion and its respective retrogradation.

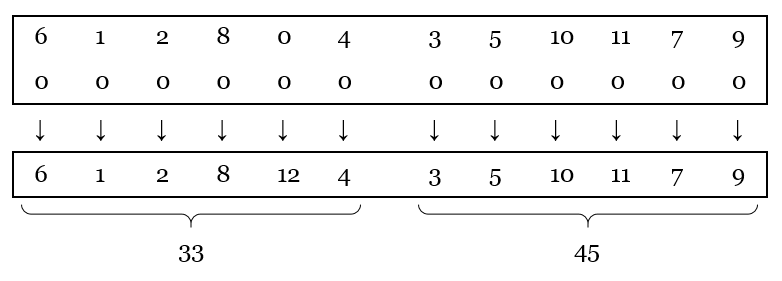
Figure 5. Derivació de les durades a partir de la sèrie

As for what temporality respects, the same tone-row allows deriving from itself the duration of the notes: it is achieved by making a simple subtraction in modulo 12, that is, subtracting and considering the results in the interval $[1, 12]$ so that if a number is left out, you can add or subtract as many 12 as necessary. This procedure greatly influences the structure of the work, as it determines blocks of 78 $(78= 1 + 2 + \ldots + 12)$ eight notes where a single row acts. In addition, he divides the sequence into two hexachords so that their respective durations are 33 and 45. The 33:45 ratio has an essential implication throughout the movement, as he will divide it into 4 structured sections as follows: There are 3 sections of 11 bars (33 x 3 x 11) and the last one is 12 bars (12 x 45 – 33). $(12=45-33)$.

Thus, in addition to the rows, there is a rhythmic series that is used and that governs, in the words of Julian White "the movement, duration, and temporal succession of the total of sound events".

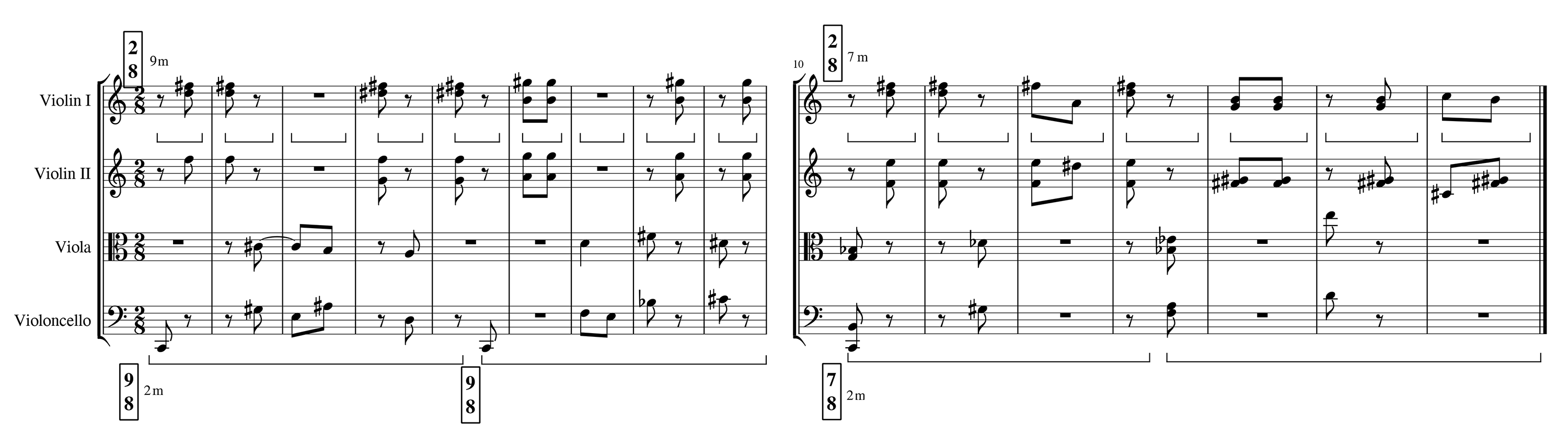
Figure 6. Example of cyclic meter trains in the last movement of the Quartet

==== Fourth movement (Molto allegro) ====
This movement contains the same compositional principles as the previous ones but also introduces the technique of cyclic meter trains, which has the function of introducing musical structures with a certain number of beats on a metric with a different amount, which causes that the drop of the metric and the particular structure to not coincide until after a certain number of iterations (which will be the least common multiple of the pulsations that make up both elements).

In particular, the following diagram (Figure 6) shows how each structure (a 9/8 and 7/8, respectively) sounds twice, adjusting with the 2/8 bar every 9 and 7 iterations, respectively.

== Criticism on serialism ==
For the first time, Gerhard radically applied the rhythmic series theory in this quartet: The third movement can be understood as a study of proportions, and for it to be effective it is necessary to ensure perceptibility to the listener. These proportions, in part, could be derived from the same tone-row, and play with this ambivalence. Gerhard continually sought to keep updated with the innovations in all the art forms, science and technology, which greatly influenced the way he conceived and analyzed music.

"In the final two movements of the Quartet, Gerhard tries to rationalize such correspondences and to establish in his music precise connections between the pitch- and time-dimensions, which derive from a preconceived constructive plan. Thus, to every note in the series measured in semitones from a 'root-note' in the hexachordal system, a number is made to correspond it such that it can equally refer to a scale of time or of metrical values. Such a plan of organization may appear extremely rigid. But Roberto Gerhard is no pedant. He always knows how to preserve his freedom of action in confronting any musical problem." Roman Vlad

Instead of assigning a number sequence to all rhythms (which would determine the rhythmic pattern a priori), he preferred to work the series on more general instances (metric, rhythmic) and afterwards specify at a smaller scale. This distinguished him from other styles of serialism, criticized for lacking freedom and intuition. The other distinctive feature is the fact that he works with different time proportions that serve as a guide.

== Premiere and recordings ==
Completed in 1955, the quartet (dedicated to the Parrenin Quartet) premiered in August of the following year at Dartington Summer School, with a total duration of 19 minutes.

Notable recordings include the Kreutzer quartet and the Arditti Quartet.

== Bibliography ==
=== Alphabetical reference list ===
- «'All-Arditti' CDs on Various Labels». [Last consulted on: April 17, 2020].
- «Roberto Gerhard, Kreutzer Quartet – String Quartets 1 & 2». [Last consulted on: April 17, 2020].
- n.a. «London concerts». The Musical Times, February 1951, p. 83.
- n.d. «Roberto Gerhard: A Survey: Chronology». Tempo (139), 1981, p. 3-4.
- Babbit, Milton «Some Aspects of Twelve-Tone Composition». Sonus: A Journal of Investigations into Global Musical Possibilities (13/1), 1992, p. 56-74.
- Boulez, Pierre. Notes of an Apprenticeship, p. 268-275.
- Drew, David «Roberto Gerhard». The Musical Times (111(1525)), 1970, p. 307-308.
- Duque, Carlos «Serial and melodic evolution in the work of Roberto Gerhard: an explorer in the avant-garde». Perspectives on Gerhard: Selected Proceedings of the 2nd and 3rd International Roberto Gerhard Conferences, 2012.
- Gerhard, Robert «Developments in twelve-tone technique». The Score and IMA Magazine (17), 1956.
- Homs, Joaquim «Roberto Gerard, the human side». Proceedings of the 1st International Roberto Gerhard Conference, 2011, p. 6-8.
- Mitchell, Rachel «Form and function in Roberto Gerhard's String Quartet no. 1». Proceedings of the 1st International Roberto Gerhard Conference, 2011.
- Mitchell, Rachel. «Roberto Gerhard's Serial Procedures and Formal Design in String Quartets Nos. 1 and 2». In: Adkins, Monty. The Roberto Gerhard Companion. Routledge, 2016.
- Muñoz, Xavier. The house of Alice Roughton.
- Sánchez de Andrés, Leticia. Pasión, desarraigo y literatura: el compositor Robert Gerhard. Antonio Machado Libros, 2015.
- Sardà, Albert «Robert Gerhard: un gran impuls per a la música catalana». Quaderns de Vilaniu (40), 2001, p. 63-70.
- Vlad, Roman «My First Impressions of Robert Gerhard's Music». The Score, 1956, p. 33.
- White, Julian. «A Sense of Proportion: Gerhard and the Postwar Avant-Garde». In: Adkins, Russ. Essays on Roberto Gerhard. Cambridge Scholars Publishing, 2017.
- White, Julian «'Lament and laughter': emotional responses to exile in Gerhard's post-Civil War works». Proceedings of the 1st International Roberto Gerhard Conference, 2011.
- White, Julian «National Traditions in the Music of Roberto Gerhard». Tempo (184), 1993, p. 2-13.
