= Carola Bauckholt =

German composer

Carola Bauckholt (born 21 August 1959) is a German composer. She was born in Krefeld, West Germany. She worked at the Marienplatz Theater in Krefeld and studied music with Mauricio Kagel at the Cologne College of Music and Dance from 1978–84.

Bauckholt in 1985 co-founded Thürmchen Verlag (literally, "Turret Publications"), a publisher of experimental music in Cologne, and in 1991 co-founded the affiliated Thürmchen ensemble, also in Cologne. In 1990-91, she attended the State Academy of Fine Arts Stuttgart on scholarship, in 1992 the Schreyahn Artists' Colony in Lower Saxony and in 1997 the Villa Massimo in Rome.

== Honors and awards ==
- Young Composers of North Rhine-Westphalia
- Bernd Alois Zimmermann Today
- Bernd Alois Zimmermann Scholarship from the City of Cologne (1986)
- Chosen for ISCM World Music Days (1987)
- Cologne-New York Exchange (1989)
- West German Radio Competition (1989)
- Carl Maria von Weber Competition (Dresden 1992/3)
- GEDOK (Federation of [German & Austrian female] Artists' Associations) International Orchestral Competition (1994)
- Stuttgart Composers' Competition (second prize)
- Boswil International Composers' Competition (second prize)
- Chosen for Blue Bridge [festival?] (1996, Dresden)
- Chosen for ISCM World Music Days (1996, Copenhagen)
- Chosen for ISCM World Music Days (1997, Seoul)
- Villa Massimo German Academy in Rome fellowship (1997)
- Female Artists' Prize of North Rhine-Westphalia (1998)
- German Music Authors' Prize in experimental composition (2010)

== Works ==
Selected works include:

- Grave (1982)
- Der gefaltete Blick (1984)
- Das klagende Leid (1985)
- Polizeitrieb (1985)
- Trio (1988/89)
- erinnern vergessen (1989)
- 3 Sätze für Blechbläserquintett (1989)
- Schraubdichtung (1989/90)
- langsamer als ich dachte (1990)
- mehr oder weniger (1991)
- In gewohnter Umgebung I (1991)
- offen und beweglich (1992)
- Geräusche (1992)
- Luftwurzeln (1993)
- Klarinettentrio (1993)
- Streichtrio (1994)
- Pumpe (1994)
- Treibstoff (1995)
- vertraute Rätsel (1995/96)
- Doina (1996)
- Kurbel und Wolke (1997)
- Stachel der Empfindlichkeit (1997/98)
- nein allein (1999/2000)
- Nestwärme (2000)
- Atempause (2000/01)
- streicheln (2001)
- nachts – drei Frauenstimmen im Taxi (2004)
- Vollmond, unter null (2004)
- Gegenwind (2004)
- hellhörig (2004–2007), premiered at the Munich Biennale 2008
- Instinkt (2007)
- Vormittagsspuk (2008)
- Mensch und Tier (2008/2009)
- Myzel (2009)
- Liebeslied (2010)
- Schlammflocke (2010)
- Emil will nicht schlafen … (2010)
- Hirn & Ei (2010/2011)
- ohne worte (2011)
- Lichtung (2011)
- Laufwerk (2011)
- ohne worte zwei (2011)
- Humus (2011)
- Zugvögel (2011/2012)
- Schlammflocke II (2012)
- Kohle, Kreide (2012)
- Stroh (2012/2013)
- Sog (2012/2013)
- Brunnen (2013)
- Im Auge des Klangs (2017/18)
- Aus dem Geröll (percussion concerto) (2022/23)

=== Discography ===
- Klingt Gut (WERGO, 1997)
- Gesang und Geräusch (Timescraper/Deutsche Akademie Villa Massimo Rom, 1998)
- Alles theatre! (Stradivarius, 2004)
- hellhörig (Coviello, 2010)
- Ich muss mit dir reden performed by no:Cikada Ensemble (no:2L, 2015)
- Erbe: Neue Werke Für Harry Partch Instrumente (Legacy: New Works for Harry Partch Instruments) performed by de:Ensemble MusikFabrik; composers Sampo Haapamäki, Martin Smolka, and Carola Bauckholt (WERGO, 2019)
