= Joaquim Homs =

Spanish composer (1906–2003)

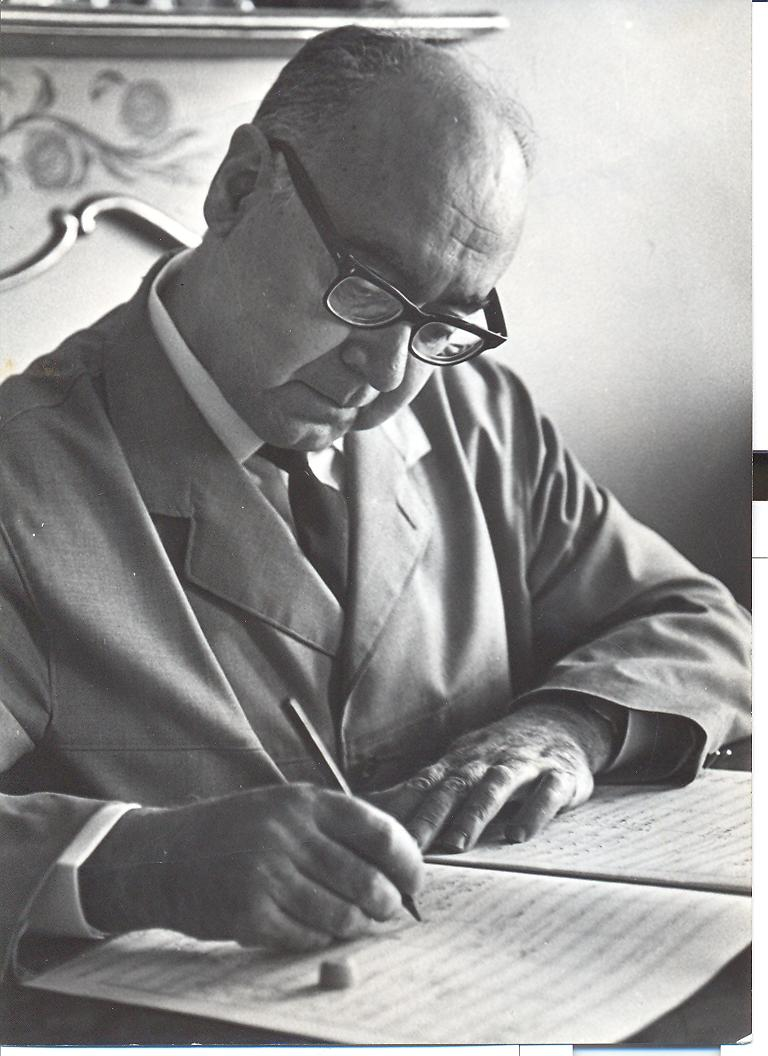
Joaquim Homs

Joaquim Homs i Oller (Catalan pronunciation: [ʒu.əˈkim ˈɔms]; 21 or 22 August 1906 – 9 September 2003) was a Spanish composer.

Homs was born in Barcelona, and studied cello until 1922. Afterwards, he educated himself in composition before studying on and off with others from 1931 to 1938. From 1930 to 1936 he studied composition with Roberto Gerhard (Menéndez Aleyxandre and Pizà 2001). He is regarded by one author as not just a Catalan, but also a Spanish composer (Menéndez Aleyxandre 1980), while another source names him only as Catalan (Menéndez Aleyxandre and Pizà 2001).

His early style was characterized by the use of free counterpoint, already moving towards atonality, and beginning in 1954 he began using twelve-tone technique. While his style remained loyal to modernism, his later works no longer adhered to strict twelve-note technique (Menéndez Aleyxandre and Pizà 2001).

He died at his home in Barcelona at the age of 97.

The personal papers of Joaquim Homs are preserved in the Biblioteca de Catalunya.

When asked by the British encyclopedia The World of Music in the mid-1950s what he considered to be his chief works, his answer was:

- Duet for Flute and Clarinet (1936)
- String Quartet No. 1 (1938)
- Violin sonata (1941)
- Sonata for oboe and bass clarinet (1942)
- Variations on a popular Catalonia theme (1943)
- String Quartets No. 2 (1949) and No. 3 (1950)
- Poem by J. Carner for voice and piano (1935)
- Four psalms for baritone and chamber orchestra (1939)
- Ten choral responses (1943)
- Choral Mass (1943)
- Rhymes for voice and piano (1950) (Anon. n.d.)
