= Seven Cantares for soprano and guitar =

Seven Cantares for soprano and guitar is a musical piece for voice and classical guitar composed by the Catalan composer Robert Gerhard (1896–1970), based on poems by an unknown author. The work consists of seven songs composed in 1956 and a piece for solo guitar composed the following year, titled Fantasía, which can be played as an interlude to the songs or as a separate piece. A reviewer for Music & Letters suggests that the works are traditional folksongs, arranged by Gerhard.

The seven songs, by unknown authors, are: La Indita, El Toro, La Auséncia, Un Galán y su Morena, La Lobada, La Muerte y la Doncella, and Reinas de la Baraja.

The work was premiered in 1957 by soprano Sophie Wyss and guitarist Julian Bream in London, with the score edited by BM (Belwin-Mills Music Ltd.). The work was included in a concert on 5 March 1970 in a memorial concert.
