= Hymnody =

Robert Gerhard's Hymnody is a contemporary classical work from 1963, which was an assignment from BBC. This piece was written during February and March of that year.

== Composer notes ==
A note from the composer:

My head was full of psalms while I was writing this work. I feel excited, sometimes agonized because of psalmist words, but I cannot say that at any time I was aware of any direct correspondence between a musical image and a particular poetic image. Yes, despite this, I quoted two verses from Psalms Book, one on the first page of the score and the other one on the last, not to relate them specifically with the musical context, but to indicate them. Symbolically an imaginative clima and, above all, to testify the natural involvement that made me write this work.

— Robert Gerhard

First citation comes from Psalm 22, vers 12: "... Cashan's strong bulls messed me up;" the second one from Psalm 88, vers 12: "will your wonders be known in the dark?"

== Orchestration and instruments ==
This work was written in nine strongly contrasted sections, played without a break.

Orchestration: flute, oboe, clarinet, horn, trumpet, trombone, tuba, percussion, vibraphone, Korean temple block, 3 Chinese toms, clave, timp, xylorimb, bonbo, tamb, xylophone.

== Premiere and criticism ==
Hymnody, a BBC assignment, was written in February and March 1963, and was premiered on "Thursday Invitation Concert" on May 23 the same year, by members of the "London Virtuoso Ensemble", directed by Jacques-Louis Monod.

A distinguished work and, often, poetically beautiful... Mr. Gerhard's rich and accurate harmonic imagination made an especially powerful impression.

— Daily Telegraph
