= Christopher Shaw (composer) =

British composer

Christopher Shaw (30 July 1924 – 27 September 1995) was a British composer.

Shaw was born and lived in London, and studied at New College, Oxford, from 1942 through 1944 with R. O. Morris and Herbert Kennedy Andrews. He wrote principally choral music, of which the most notable example may be the cantata Peter and the Lame Man for soli, chorus and orchestra. He also wrote some music criticism and translated opera librettos. Shaw was reluctant to promote his own music and much of his work remained unperformed in his lifetime and since his death. The critic David Drew was a friend and advocate.

He died while on holiday at Gatehouse of Fleet, Galloway, Scotland, aged 71. Recordings of A Lesson from Ecclesiastes, Music, when soft voices die, To the Bandusian Spring and Peter and the Lame Man were issued on Argo Records in 1975.

== Selected works ==
- Piano Sonata (1945)
- Ode to Evening, cantata, high voice (1948)
- Concerto for Orchestra (1948-9)
- Clarinet Sonata (1949) (fp. Colin Davis)
- Croagh Patrick, cantata for speaker, contralto, baritone, strings and timpani (1950)
- Four Poems by James Joyce for high voice, flute, harp and string quartet (fp. November 1956)
- Concerto for Strings
- Inventions for Piano (1955)
- The Shepherd's Wonder for chorus (1956)
- Seven Folk Songs from the Island of Chios (1958)
- No Room at the Inn, carol, published Novello (1961)
- A Lesson from Ecclesiastes (1963)
- Three Poems by D.G. Rosetti (1963)
- Peter and the Lame Man for soli, chorus and orchestra (1964-7, rev. 1970)
- Music, when soft voices die for chorus (1972)
- To the Bandusian Spring for chorus (1974)
- In Praise of Gardens choral suite with piano and organ (1975 - orchestrated 1978)
- Fantasia for piano (1978-80)
- Five Pieces for Wind Quintet (1982-3)
- In Memorium Jan Palach, cantata for soprano, bass and orchestra (1985) (first version, 1969, destroyed)
