= Domed label =

Type of label

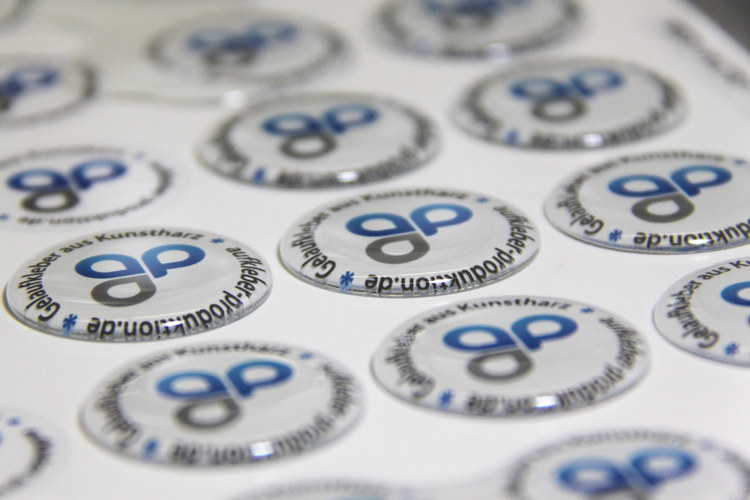
Domed labels on a backing sheet

Domed labels are printed pressure-sensitive labels that have a thick, dome-shaped clear polyurethane coating.

== Uses ==
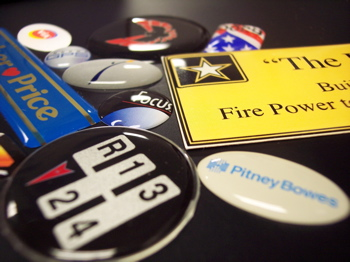
Screen printed and digitally printed domed labels

Domed labels are used in many applications. Equipment manufacturers apply them as permanent markings for their products as they are durable, and their three-dimensional appearance catches the eye.

Domed labels are much more permanent than others and do not show wear; the clear polyurethane substance, even after curing (hardening), is self-healing. Minor scratches or cuts heal themselves, and the label looks new once again.

Several clothing manufacturers use domed labels as disposable items by affixing them to in-store hangers. The hangers are shaped in such a way that the customer will touch the label first when picking up the article of clothing for inspection. This initial tactile feel adds to the perceived value of the garment. Costume jewelers have also used domed labels for their products.

An example of a domed label application for tactile purposes can be seen in the photo. At the bottom left, there is an example used to label the gearshift knob of an automobile.

== Production ==
The coating can be applied in liquid form in many different ways, ranging from manual application via syringe to optically guided, automated dispensing equipment. Once applied, the polyurethane liquid flows to the edge of the label and stops (due to the surface tension of the liquid), hardening into a clear dome.

1. The first layer is the label material. The material can be any print-industry recognized label material (from paper to many forms of plastic).
2. The second layer is the ink. The label can be multiple colors, photo-quality graphics, or simple text. The ink is applied using screen or digital print technology.
3. After the ink has cured (dried), the labels are laser- or die-cut and the waste material between labels removed from the press sheet.
4. The liquid polyurethane material is then applied to the labels on the press sheet and left to cure.
