= Francis Dhomont =

French composer (1926–2023)

- Dhomont c. 2010
- Born: 2 November 1926; Paris, France
- Died: 28 December 2023 (aged 97); Avignon, France
- Occupations: Composer; Academic teacher
- Organizations: Université de Montréal; Canadian Electroacoustic Community

Francis Dhomont (2 November 1926 – 28 December 2023) was a French composer, a pioneer of electroacoustic and acousmatic music who worked and taught both in France and in Québec.

== Biography ==
Born in Paris on 2 November 1926, Dhomont studied composition with Ginette Waldmeier, Charles Koechlin and Nadia Boulanger. In compositions for instruments and voices from 1944 to 1963, he tried to "reconcile modality and atonality".

In 1963 he decided to dedicate his time to electroacoustic composition utilising natural sounds. Public performances of his music are done using the French "diffusion" technique over multiple loudspeakers. His work consists exclusively of tape pieces using natural, or "found" sounds, exploring morphological interplay and the ambiguities between sound and the images it may create. He presented his compositions in France and abroad.

Dhomont's work won international awards including at the Bourges International Electroacoustic Music Competition (France), the Magisterium Prize in 1988, Prix Ars Electronica in 1992 (Linz, Austria). In 1997, as the winner of the Canada Council for the Arts' Lynch-Staunton Prize, he was supported by the DAAD Artists-in-Berlin Program for a residence in Berlin. He was awarded a career grant by the Conseil des arts et des lettres du Québec.

Dhomont was the editor of several electroacoustic music journals. He produced radio programs for Radio-Canada and Radio France, and participated in juries of competitions.

From 1978 to 2005, he worked both in France and Québec, teaching at the Université de Montréal from 1980 to 1996. He was a founding member of the Canadian Electroacoustic Community.

Dhomont lived in Avignon, where he died on 28 December 2023, at the age of 97.

== Recordings ==
Dhomont's recordings include:

- ... et autres utopies (empreintes DIGITALes, IMED 0682, 2006)
- Jalons (empreintes DIGITALes, IMED 0365, 2003)
- Cycle du son (empreintes DIGITALes, IMED 0158, 2001)
- Frankenstein Symphony (Asphodel, ASP 0978, 1997)
- Forêt profonde (empreintes DIGITALes, IMED 9634, 1996)
- Sous le regard d'un soleil noir (empreintes DIGITALes, IMED 9633, 1996)
- Les dérives du signe (empreintes DIGITALes, IMED 9608, 1996)
- Cycle de l'errance (empreintes DIGITALes, IMED 9607, 1996)
- Mouvances~Métaphores (empreintes DIGITALes, IMED 9107/08, 1991)

== List of works ==
- À cordes perdues (1977), doublebass, and tape
- L'air du large (1997–98)
- À propos de K (2006)
- Asie (1975), audiovisual presentation (images by Giovanni Biaggini)
- Assemblages (1972)
- AvatArsSon (1998)
- Brief an den Vater (2005)
- Cathédrale d'images (1977), large-scale audiovisual presentation
- Chiaroscuro (1987)
- Chroniques de la lumière (1989, 2005)
- Cité du dedans (1972)
- Convulsive! (1995)
- Corps et âme (2001–02)
- CPH Pendler Music (1997)
- Drôles d'oiseaux (1985–86, 2001)
- L'électro (1990)
- En cuerdas (1998)
- Espace / Escape (1989)
- Espaces sonores pour des textes de Jean Tortel (1976), radiophonic piece
- Figures de la nuit / Faces of the Night (1991–92)
- Forêt profonde (1994–96)
- Frankenstein Symphony (1997)
- Glank-50 (2002)
- Here and There (2003)
- Je te salue, vieil océan! (1998, 2000–04)
- Lettre de Sarajevo (1995–96)
- La liberté ou la mort (1976), incidental music
- Mais laisserons-nous mourir Arianna? (1979)
- Métonymie ou le corps impossible (1976)
- Moirures (2006), videomusic
- Les moirures du temps (1999–2000)
- ... mourir un peu (1984–87)
- Nocturne à Combray (1995–96)
- Novars (1989)
- Objets retrouvés (1996)
- Phonurgie (1998)
- Poe-Debussy, Autour de la maison Usher (1988), incidental music for a musical theater by Marthe Forget
- Points de fuite (1982)
- Premières traces du Choucas (2006)
- Previews (1994)
- Puzzle (1975)
- Qui est là? (1990)
- Reflets LR (2003–06), videomusic
- Ricercare (1998)
- Signé Dionysos (1986–91)
- Simulacres: un autoportrait (1991)
- Sol y sombra L'espace des spectres (1998, 2000), guitar, and tape
- Sous le regard d'un soleil noir (1979–81)
- Studio de nuit (1992)
- Syntagmes (1975)
- Terre d'ombres (2006), videomusic
- Les traces du rêve (1986), film soundtrack, Les traces du rêve by Jean-Daniel Lafond, NFB
- Transits élémentaires (1983)
- Un autre Printemps (2000)
- Un autre Printemps [vidéo] (2000)
- Vol d'Arondes (1999, 2002)
- Voyage dans le voyage (1991), radiophonic piece
- Voyage-miroir (2004)
- Zones et rhizomes (1978)

== Publications ==
Dhomont published many articles on esthetic topics, influencing philosophical debates on the evolution of electroacoustic music.

- Dhomont, Francis. "L'écriture acousmatique: Rappels et questionnements". eContact! 12.4 — Perspectives on the Electroacoustic Work / Perspectives sur l'œuvre électroacoustique (August 2010). Montréal: CEC.
- _____. 2008. "Abstraction et figuration dans ma musique / Abstraktion und Gegenständlichkeit in meiner Musik" (French/German). Komposition und Musikwissenschaft im Dialog VI, edited by Marcus Erbe and Christoph von Blumröder. Vienna: Verlag Der Apfel, 2008. pp. 134–167. Available online in eContact! 11.2 — Figures canadiennes (2) / Canadian Figures (2) (July 2009). Montréal: CEC.
- _____. "Abstraction et figuration dans ma musique." eContact! 11.2 — Figures canadiennes (2) / Canadian Figures (2) (July 2009). Montréal: CEC.
- _____. "Éléments pour une syntaxe". eContact! 11.2 — Figures canadiennes (2) / Canadian Figures (2) (July 2009). Montréal: CEC.
