= David Drew (music critic) =

British music critic (1930–2009)

David Drew (19 September 1930 – 25 July 2009) was a British music critic and musicologist. He was particularly known for his work on Kurt Weill, whom he "almost single-handedly rescued [...] from neglect and promoted him to his present position as an important 20th-century composer".

== Life and career ==
David Drew was born in Putney, southwest London, on 19 September 1930. Educated at Harrow and Peterhouse, Cambridge, Drew became music critic for the New Statesman from 1959 until 1967. In 1971 he took over as the editor of the music journal Tempo, owned by Boosey and Hawkes, and then became director of publications at Boosey in 1975 and then director of new music until he left the company in 1992. Drew wrote several hundred articles for the music press.

He published the authoritative catalogue of Weill's music, Kurt Weill: A Handbook (London, 1987) and, in German, edited and annotated a collection of Weill's writings, Kurt Weill: Ausgewählte Schriften, and a symposium of writings by others about Weill, Über Kurt Weill (both Frankfurt, 1975). He also produced performing editions of many of Weill's works and devised the significant celebration and revival of many of Weill's works at the 1975 Berliner Musikfest; much of this project was later recorded by the participating artists and the London Sinfonietta conducted by David Atherton and issued by the Decca Record Company in 1976.

Other composers he was known for advocating were the Pole Henryk Górecki, Americans Elliott Carter and Roger Sessions, Germans and Austrians HK Gruber, Kurt Schwertsik, Berthold Goldschmidt, Leopold Spinner, Boris Blacher and Rudolf Wagner-Régeny, Italian Luigi Dallapiccola, Catalan exile Roberto Gerhard (a close friend from his student days in Cambridge), conductor-composer Igor Markevitch and British composers Alexander Goehr, Robin Holloway, Christopher Shaw and Walter Leigh. He first drew attention with the first important articles on Olivier Messiaen to be published in English, in the journal The Score, and his 60-page chapter on 'Modern French Music', in the 1957 symposium European Music in the Twentieth Century edited by Howard Hartog (Routledge, later Pelican books 1961).

In the 1960s and 1970s he devised, managed and edited an important series of recordings of 20th-century and contemporary music under the aegis of the Gulbenkian Foundation. Known as 'Music Today', the first albums of the series—almost entirely consisting of first recordings and including premiere recordings of music by Roberto Gerhard, Nikos Skalkottas, Dallapiccola, Stefan Wolpe, Charles Koechlin, Messiaen, Pierre Boulez and the two symphonies of Kurt Weill—were issued by EMI Records. They were reissued in the 1970s, along with a new batch of recordings, by Argo Records. After his departure from Boosey & Hawkes, Drew worked in a similar capacity producing recordings for the German label Largo Records—these included a Weill album, 'Berlin im Licht', a series of recordings of music by Berthold Goldschmidt, and a double album including works by Weill, Blacher, Goldschmidt, Milhaud, Vaughan Williams and Harrington Shortall entitled Testimonies of War: Kriegzeugnisse 1914-45.

Drew died on 25 July 2009 in London.
