= International Society for Contemporary Music =

Music organization

- International Society for Contemporary Music
- Abbreviation: ISCM
- Formation: 1922
- Founder: Egon Wellesz
- Origins: Salzburg, Germany
- Fields: Music
- President: Frank J. Oteri
- Parent organization: Internationale Gesellschaft für Neue Musik (IGNM)
- Website: iscm.org

The International Society for Contemporary Music (ISCM) is a music organization that promotes contemporary classical music.

The organization was established in Salzburg in 1922 as Internationale Gesellschaft für Neue Musik (IGNM) following the Internationale Kammermusikaufführungen Salzburg, a festival of modern chamber music held as part of the Salzburg Festival. It was founded by the Austrian (later British) composer Egon Wellesz and the Cambridge academic Edward J Dent, who first met when Wellesz visited England in 1906.

In 1936 the rival Permanent Council for the International Co-operation of Composers, set up under Richard Strauss, was accused of furthering Nazi Party cultural ambitions in opposition to the non-political ISCM. British composer Herbert Bedford, acting as co-Secretary, defended its neutrality.

Aside from hiatuses in 1940 and 1943-5 due to World War II and in 2020–21 due to the global COVID-19 pandemic, the ISCM's core activity has been an annual festival of contemporary classical music held every year at a different location, the first of which took place in 1923 in Salzburg, which has come to be known as the ISCM World Music Days (sometimes World New Music Days, abbreviated either WMD or WNMD depending on which name is used). There have been a total of 92 of these thus far, the most recent of which took place in Tallinn, Estonia in May 2019. The 2021 WMD in Shanghai and Nanning has been postponed until March 2022 and the 2022 WNMD is scheduled to take place in New Zealand in August 2022.

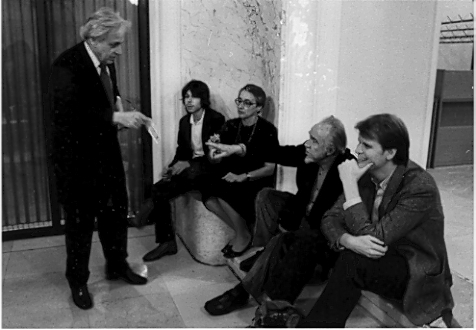
From left: György Ligeti, his son Lukas, his wife Vera Spitz, Conlon Nancarrow and Michael Daugherty at ISCM World Music Days in Graz, Austria, 1982

Each year, during the World Music Days. ISCM members also convene in a General Assembly. Membership in the ISCM is organized through national sections that promote contemporary music in each country. These sections are usually organizations independent from the ISCM that send delegates to the ISCM General Assembly. Each member of the national section is also a member of ISCM and may send in 6 works that are evaluated for performance at the World Music Days. National organizations that promote contemporary music, but have not been designated as the nation section of ISCM, are sometimes given an associate membership status. This status also applies to the members of these organizations. Some individual music professionals receive the "honorary membership" status. The ISCM is governed by an executive committee consisting of seven people; two (Secretary General and Treasurer) are appointed positions and the remaining five (President, Vice President, and three regular members) are chosen from and by the delegates in an election during the General Assembly.

Since 1991, the ISCM has also published an annual World New Music Magazine, a print publication that is distributed to its members for further dissemination. A total of 28 issues have been produced. Recent magazine issues are available as digitally downloadable PDFs from the ISCM's website. ISCM is a member of the International Music Council. The current members of the executive committee of the ISCM (as of the June 2025 General Assembly which took place at the O'culto de Ajuda in Lisbon, Portugal) are: Frank J. Oteri (USA), President; Rebecca Diependaele (Belgium), Vice President; Oľga Smetanova (Slovakia), Secretary General; David Pay (Canada), Treasurer; Chialin Pan (Taiwan); Magnus Bunnskog (Sweden); Deborah Keyser (Wales), and Wolfgang Renzl (Austria), Legal Counsel.

== ISCM World Music Days ==
- 1923 in Salzburg, Austria
- 1924 in Prague, Czechoslovakia and Salzburg, Austria
- 1925 in Prague, Cezechoslovakia and Venice, Italy
- 1926 in Zürich, Switzerland
- 1927 in Frankfurt am Main, Germany
- 1928 in Siena, Italy
- 1929 in Geneva, Switzerland
- 1930 in Liège/Brussels, Belgium
- 1931 in Oxford/London, England
- 1932 in Vienna, Austria
- 1933 in Amsterdam, Netherlands
- 1934 in Florence, Italy
- 1935 in Prague, Czechoslovakia
- 1936 in Barcelona, Spain
- 1937 in Paris, France
- 1938 in London, England
- 1939 in Warsaw/Krakau, Poland
- 1941 in New York, New York, U.S.A.
- 1942 in Berkeley, California, U.S.A.
- 1946 in London, England
- 1947 in Copenhagen/Lund, Denmark
- 1948 in Amsterdam/Scheveningen, Netherlands
- 1949 in Palermo/Taormina, Italy
- 1950 in Brussels, Belgium
- 1951 in Frankfurt am Main, Germany
- 1952 in Salzburg, Austria
- 1953 in Oslo, Norway
- 1954 in Haifa, Israel
- 1955 in Baden-Baden, West Germany
- 1956 in Stockholm, Sweden
- 1957 in Zürich, Switzerland
- 1958 in Strasbourg, France
- 1959 in Rome/Naples, Italy
- 1960 in Cologne, West Germany
- 1961 in Vienna, Austria
- 1962 in London, England
- 1963 in Amsterdam, Netherlands
- 1964 in Copenhagen, Denmark
- 1965 in Madrid, Spain
- 1966 in Stockholm, Sweden
- 1967 in Prague, Czechoslovakia
- 1968 in Warsaw, Poland
- 1969 in Hamburg, West Germany
- 1970 in Basel, Switzerland
- 1971 in London, England
- 1972 in Graz, Austria
- 1973 in Reykjavík, Iceland
- 1974 in Rotterdam/Utrecht/Amsterdam/Den Haag/Hilversum, Netherlands
- 1975 in Paris, France
- 1976 in Boston, Massachusetts, U.S.A.
- 1977 in Bonn, West Germany
- 1978 in Stockholm, Sweden and Helsinki, Finland
- 1979 in Athens, Geeece
- 1980 in Jerusalem/Tel Aviv/Be'er Scheva/Kibbuz Schefajim, Israel
- 1981 in Brusells/Gent, Belgium
- 1982 in Graz, Austria
- 1983 in Aarhus, Denmark
- 1984 in Toronto/Montreal, Canada
- 1985 in The Netherlands
- 1986 in Budapest, Hungary
- 1987 in Cologne/Bonn/Frankfurt am Main, West Germany
- 1988 in Hong Kong
- 1989 in Amsterdam, Netherlands
- 1990 in Oslo, Norway
- 1991 in Zürich, Switzerland
- 1992 in Warsaw, Poland
- 1993 in Mexico City, Mexico
- 1994 in Stockholm, Sweden
- 1995 in Essen/Bochum/Dortmund/Duisburg (Ruhrgebiet), Germany
- 1996 in Copenhagen, Denmark
- 1997 in Seoul, South Korea
- 1998 in Manchester, England
- 1999 in Romania/Moldova
- 2000 in Luxembourg
- 2001 in Yokohama, Japan
- 2002 in Hong Kong S.A.R., China
- 2003 in Slovenia
- 2004 in Switzerland
- 2005 in Zagreb, Croatia
- 2006 in Stuttgart, Germany
- 2007 in Hong Kong S.A.R., China
- 2008 in Vilnius, Lithuania
- 2009 in Sweden
- 2010 in Sydney, Australia
- 2011 in Zagreb, Croatia
- 2012 in Belgium
- 2013 in Košice/Bratislava, Slovakia and Vienna, Austria
- 2014 in Wroclaw, Poland
- 2015 in Ljubljana, Slovenia
- 2016 in Tongyeong, South Korea
- 2017 in Vancouver, Canada
- 2018 in Peking, China
- 2019 in Tallinn, Estonia
- 2020 in Auckland/Christchurch, New Zealand postponed to 2022
- 2021 in Shanghai/Nanning, cancelled
- 2022 in Auckland/Christchurch, New Zealand
- 2023 in Johannesburg/Soweto/Cape Town, South Africa
- 2024 in the Faroe Islands
- 2025 in Lisbon/Porto, Portugal
- 2026 in Bucharest, Romania (forthcoming)

== ISCM Honorary Members ==
- Louis Andriessen
- Milton Babbitt
- Béla Bartók
- Sten Broman
- Ferruccio Busoni
- John Cage
- Elliott Carter
- Alfredo Casella
- Friedrich Cerha
- Chen Yi
- Chou Wen-chung
- Edward Clar
- Paul Collaer
- Aaron Copland
- Luigi Dallapiccola
- Edward Dent
- Franz Eckert
- Óscar Esplá
- Manuel de Falla
- Michael Finnissy
- Jacqueline Fontyn
- Vinko Globokar
- Sofia Gubaidulina
- Alois Hába
- Anton Haefeli
- Ernst Henschel
- Paul Hindemith
- Arthur Honegger
- Klaus Huber
- Sukhi Kang
- Zoltán Kodály
- Charles Koechlin
- Zygmunt Krauze
- Ernst Křenek
- György Kurtág
- André Laporte
- Doming Lam
- György Ligeti
- Witold Lutosławski
- Walter Maas
- Gian Francesco Malipiero
- Yori-Aki Matsudaira
- Arne Mellnäs
- Olivier Messiaen
- Darius Milhaud
- Conlon Nancarrow
- Arne Nordheim
- Per Nørgård
- Vítězslav Novák
- Reinhard Oehlschlägel
- Arvo Pärt
- Krzysztof Penderecki
- Goffredo Petrassi
- Willem Pijper
- Maurice Ravel
- Karin Rehnqvist
- Hans Rosbaud
- Hilding Rosenberg
- Albert Roussel
- Antonio Rubin
- Kaija Saariaho
- Paul Sacher
- Hermann Scherchen
- R. Murray Schafer
- Arnold Schoenberg
- Roger Sessions
- Jean Sibelius
- Linda Catlin Smith
- Igor Stravinsky
- Karol Szymanowski
- Toru Takemitsu
- Chris Walraven
- Ralph Vaughan Williams
- Iannis Xenakis
- Isang Yun
- Jōji Yuasa

== ISCM ExCom (Update: July 17, 2025) ==
- Frank J. Oteri, U.S.A. (President)
- Rebecca Diependaele, Belgium (Vice President)
- Magnus Bunnskog, Sweden
- Chia-Lin Pan, Taiwan
- Deborah Keyser, Wales
- David Pay, Music on Main/Canada (Treasurer)
- Oľga Smetanová, Slovakia (Secretary General)

== ISCM World Music Days jury members ==
- Ernest Ansermet, 1923, 1924, 1929, 1932, 1936, 1938
- Béla Bartók, 1924
- Alban Berg, 1928, 1931
- Nadia Boulanger, 1932, 1934, 1951
- Pierre Boulez, 1961
- Elliott Carter, 1954, 1960, 1963, 1976
- Alfredo Casella, 1924, 1925, 1928, 1931, 1934
- Aaron Copland, 1942
- Luigi Dallapiccola, 1950, 1953, 1966
- Franco Donatoni, 1971, 1975
- Henri Dutilleux, 1956, 1962, 1967
- Brian Ferneyhough, 1978
- Luc Ferrari, 1972
- Wolfgang Fortner, 1958, 1960, 1969
- Vinko Globokar, 1972
- Alois Hába, 1927, 1932, 1938, 1958, 1961
- Cristóbal Halffter, 1968, 1970, 1975, 1980
- Roman Haubenstock-Ramati, 1980
- Arthur Honegger, 1926
- Klaus Huber, 1965, 1969
- Jacques Ibert, 1930, 1937, 1948
- Zoltán Kodály, 1925
- Marek Kopelent, 1977
- Ernst Křenek, 1934, 1941
- Rafael Kubelík, 1947
- Helmut Lachenmann, 1981
- Rolf Liebermann, 1955, 1957
- György Ligeti, 1966, 1972
- Witold Lutosławski, 1959, 1964, 1966, 1968, 1971
- Gian Francesco Malipiero, 1930, 1933, 1949
- Olivier Messiaen, 1955
- Darius Milhaud, 1938, 1942
- Maurice Ravel, 1929
- Aribert Reimann, 1976
- Wolfgang Rihm, 1977
- Frederic Rzewski, 1981
- Hermann Scherchen, 1923, 1926, 1935
- Dieter Schnebel, 1977
- Erwin Schulhoff, 1930
- Mátyás Seiber, 1953, 1955, 1958
- Kazimierz Serocki, 1961, 1969
- Heinrich Strobel, 1955
- Hans Heinz Stuckenschmidt, 1951
- Karol Szymanowski, 1926
- Anton Webern, 1932, 1936
- Egon Wellesz, 1923, 1925
- Christian Wolff, 1977
- Iannis Xenakis, 1975

== Significant premieres at ISCM World Music Days ==
- 1923, Salzburg, Paul Hindemith, Quintett für Streichquartett und Klarinette, op. 30 (Amar Quartet)
- 1923, Salzburg, William Walton, Streichquartett Nr. 1
- 1924, Prague, Arnold Schoenberg, Erwartung, op. 17 (Alexander von Zemlinsky)
- 1924, Prague, Alexander von Zemlinsky, Lyrische Symphonie, op. 18
- 1924, Salzburg, Ernst Křenek, Streichquartett Nr. 4, op. 24
- 1924, Salzburg, Paul Hindemith, Streichtrio, op. 34
- 1924, Salzburg, Erwin Schulhoff, 5 Stücke für Streichquartett
- 1925, Venezia, Hanns Eisler, Duo für Vl/Vc
- 1925, Prague, Gian Francesco Malipiero, Variazioni senza tema for piano and orchestra
- 1926, Zurich, William Walton, Portsmouth Point, overture for orchestra
- 1926, Zürich, Anton Webern, 5 Stücke für Orchester, op. 10
- 1933, Amsterdam, Willem Pijper, Halewijn (music drama)
- 1934, Florence, Gian Francesco Malipiero, Symphonie 1 quattro stagioni
- 1935, Prague, Karl Amadeus Hartmann, Miserae
- 1935, Prague, Anton Webern, Konzert für 9 Instrumente, op. 24
- 1936, Barcelona, Alban Berg, Violinkonzert (Louis Krasner)
- 1936, Barcelona, Ernst Křenek, Fragmente aus Karl V.
- 1937, Paris, Michiko Toyama, Yamato no koe
- 1938, London, Anton Webern, Kantate Das Augenlicht, op. 26
- 1941, New York City, Mátyás Seiber, Streichquartett Nr. 2
- 1942, Berkeley, California, Rebecca Clarke, Prelude, Allegro, Pastorale for clarinet and viola
- 1946, London, Anton Webern, Kantate Nr. 1, op. 29
- 1950, Bruxelles, Anton Webern, Kantate Nr. 2, op. 32
- 1951, Frankfurt, Karl-Birger Blomdahl, Symphonie Nr. 3 'Facetter'
- 1951, Frankfurt, Roberto Gerard, La Duenna (opera)
- 1954, Haifa, André Jolivet, Symphonie Nr. 1
- 1955, Baden-Baden, Pierre Boulez, Le Marteau sans Maître (SWF-Orchester Baden-Baden)
- 1957, Zürich, Arnold Schoenberg, Moses und Aron (stage premiere)
- 1959, Rome, Gunther Schuller, Contours
- 1960, Köln, Leni Alexander, De la muerte a la mañana
- 1960, Köln, Mauricio Kagel, Anagrama
- 1960, Köln, György Ligeti, Apparitions
- 1960, Köln, Karlheinz Stockhausen, Kontakte
- 1960, Köln, Isang Yun, Streichquartett Nr. 3
- 1961, Wien, Krzysztof Penderecki, Dimensionen der Zeit und Stille
- 1962, London, Klaus Huber, Cujus Legibus Rotantur Poli
- 1963, Amsterdam, Heinz Holliger, Kantate Erde und Himmel
- 1967, Prague, Alois Hába, Streichquartett Nr. 16
- 1968, Warszawa, Friedrich Cerha, Spiegel I
- 1975, Paris, Peter Růžička, Befragung
- 1976, Boston, David Stock, Inner Space
- 1976, Boston, Ellen Taaffe Zwilich, String Quartet
- 1977, Bonn, Peter Schat, Houdini Symphonie
- 1982, Graz, Dieter Schnebel, Thanatos Eros II
- 1982, Graz, Christoph Delz, Die Atmer der Lydia
- 1982, Graz, Heinz Holliger, Jahreszeiten (Arnold Schoenberg Chor, Erwin Ortner)
- 1982, Graz, Roman Haubenstock-Ramati, Nocturnes II
- 1982, Graz, Conlon Nancarrow, Piece for Small Orchestra, String Quartet, Study Nr. 3a, 10, 12, 21, 25, 36, 37, 40b, 41c, 43 for Player Piano
- 1982, Graz, Michael Nyman, A Handsom-Smooth-Sweet-Clear-Stroke: Or Else Play not at All (ORF-Sinfonie Orchester Wien, Lothar Zagrosek)
- 1983, Aarhus, Hans Werner Henze, 3 Concerti Piccoli
- 1983, Aarhus, Witold Lutosławski, Symphony Nr. 3
- 1983, Aarhus, Pascal Dusapin, String Quartet (Arditti Quartet)
- 1983, Aarhus, Iannis Xenakis, Tetra (Arditti Quartet)
- 1984, Toronto/Montreal, Vinko Globokar, Laboratorium
- 1987, Köln/Bonn/Frankfurt am Main, Giacinto Scelsi, Uaxuctum (Kölner Rundfunkchor, Kölner Rundfunk-Sinfonieorchester, Hans Zender)
- 1987, Köln/Bonn/Frankfurt am Main, Dieter Schnebel, Stichworte – Stichnoten (Dieter Schnebel)
- 1987, Köln/Bonn/Frankfurt am Main, Vinko Globokar, Les Emigrés
- 1987, Köln/Bonn/Frankfurt am Main, John Cage, Music for 13
- 1989, Amsterdam, Michael Jarrell, Assonance III
- 1990, Oslo, Unsuk Chin, Troerinnen
- 1990, Oslo, György Kurtág, Ligatura – Message to Frances-Marie: The Answered Unanswered Question
- 1995, Ruhrgebiet, György Kurtág, Three Messages (Kölner Rundfunk-Sinfonieorchester)
- 1995, Ruhrgebiet, Toshio Hosokawa, Super Flumina Babylonis (Ensemble Modern, Eberhard Kloke)
- 1995, Ruhrgebiet, Walter Zimmermann, Diastasis (Ensemble Modern, Eberhard Kloke)
- 1995, Ruhrgebiet, Chaya Czernowin, Amber
- 1995, Ruhrgebiet, Kunsu Shim, (untitled)
- 1998, Manchester, Peter Maxwell Davies, Il Rozzo Martello (BBC Singers)
- 2000, Luxembourg, Wolfgang Rihm, Jagden und Formen, Zustand X/2000 (Ensemble Modern)
- 2004, Switzerland, Johannes Schöllhorn, Rote Asche
- 2006, Stuttgart, Georges Aperghis, Wölfli Kantata (Neue Vocalsolisten Stuttgart, SWR Vokalensemble)
- 2006, Stuttgart, Francesco Filidei, Altro Recercar
- 2006, Stuttgart, Jennifer Walshe, passenger
- 2006, Stuttgart, Samir Odeh-Tamimi, LÁMA POÍM
- 2006, Stuttgart, Younghi Pagh-Paan, Mondschatten (Staatsoper, Staatsorchester Stuttgart)
- 2013, Kosice/Bratislava/Wien, Bernhard Lang, Monadologie XXIV...The Stoned Guest
- 2014, Wroclaw, Slawomir Kupczak, Symphony Nr. 2 für 100 Motorräder, elektrische Gitarre, Perkussion und Elektronik
- 2015, Ljubljana, Nina Šenk, Into the Shades
- 2016, Tongyeong, Yejune Synn, Zoetrope (Changwon Philharmonic Orchestra)
- 2016, Tongyeong, Nick Roth, Woodland Heights (Hong Kong New Music Ensemble)
- 2017, Vancouver, Ana Sokolović, Evta for violin and orchestra
- 2017, Vancouver, Hildegard Westerkamp, Klavierklang for piano and stereo soundtrack
- 2019, Tallinn, Helena Tulve, Nächtliche Gesänge for chamber choir

== Significant performances at ISCM World Music Days ==
- 1923, Salzburg, Arnold Schoenberg, Die hängenden Gärten, op. 15
- 1923, Salzburg, Alban Berg, Streichquartett, op. 3
- 1924, Prague, Arthur Honegger, Pacific 231
- 1924, Prague, Sergei Prokofiev, Violin Concerto
- 1924, Prague, Igor Stravinsky, Chant du Rossignol
- 1925, Venezia, Maurice Ravel, Tzigane für Vl/Kl
- 1925, Venezia, Igor Stravinsky, Piano Sonata
- 1926, Zürich, Paul Hindemith, Konzert für Orchester, op. 38
- 1926, Zürich, Kurt Weill, Violinkonzert, op. 12
- 1929, Genève, Leoš Janáček, Glagolitic Mass
- 1931, London, George Gershwin, An American in Paris
- 1931, London, Anton Webern, Symphonie, op. 21
- 1933, Amsterdam, Igor Strawinsky, Symphonie des Psaumes
- 1934, Firenze, Maurice Ravel, Piano Concerto for the left hand
- 1935, Prague, Alban Berg, Lulu-Suite
- 1935, Prague, Arnold Schoenberg, Variationen für Orchester, op. 31
- 1938, London, Olivier Messiaen, La Nativité du Seigneur
- 1942, San Francisco, Paul Hindemith, Symphonie in Es
- 1946, London, Béla Bartók, Konzert für Orchester
- 1946, London, Olivier Messiaen, Quatuor pour la Fin du Temps
- 1946, London, Arnold Schoenberg, Ode an Napoleon Bonaparte, op. 41
- 1951, Frankfurt am Main, Olivier Messiaen, 5 Rechants
- 1952, Salzburg, Bernd Alois Zimmermann, Violinkonzert
- 1953, Oslo, Zoltán Kodály, Konzert für Orchester
- 1966, Stockholm, Karlheinz Stockhausen, Kontra-Punkte Nr. 1
- 1957, Zürich, Karl Amadeus Hartmann, Symphonie Nr. 6
- 1958, Strasbourg, Bernd Alois Zimmermann, Symphonie
- 1959, Roma, Luigi Nono, Incontri per 24 strumenti
- 1959, Napoli, Igor Stravinsky, Agon
- 1959, Napoli, Igor Stravinsky, Pribaoutki
- 1959, Napoli, Karlheinz Stockhausen, Klavierstück XI
- 1959, Napoli, Karlheinz Stockhausen, Gesang der Jünglinge
- 1960, Köln, Karl Amadeus Hartmann, Symphonie Nr. 7
- 1960, Köln, Darius Milhaud, Symphonie Nr. 8
- 1961, Wien, Roman Haubenstock-Ramati, Séquences
- 1961, Wien, Edgar Varèse, Arcana
- 1963, Amsterdam, Karl Amadeus Hartmann, Symphonie Nr. 8
- 1963, Amsterdam, Pierre Boulez, Piano Sonata Nr. 2
- 1963, Amsterdam, Krzysztof Penderecki, Threnos
- 1964, Kopenhagen, Edgar Varèse, Offrandes
- 1965, Madrid, Krzysztof Penderecki, Stabat mater
- 1965, Madrid, Arnold Schoenberg, A Survivor from Warsaw, op. 46
- 1966, Stockholm, Karlheinz Stockhausen, Mikrophonie II
- 1966, Stockholm, Edgar Varèse, Octandre
- 1968, Warschau, Klaus Huber, Tenebrae
- 1968, Warszawa, György Ligeti, Requiem
- 1969, Hamburg, Roman Haubenstock-Ramati, Symphonie "K"
- 1969, Hamburg, Helmut Lachenmann, Consolation II
- 1969, Hamburg, Bernd Alois Zimmermann, Présence
- 1971, London, György Ligeti, Kammerkonzert
- 1971, London, Salvatore Sciarrino, ...Da und Divertimento
- 1971, London, Iannis Xenakis, Atrées
- 1972, Graz, Mauricio Kagel, Repertoire (from: Staatstheater)
- 1972, Graz, Witold Lutosławski, Concerto for Violoncello and Orchestra
- 1972, Graz, Dieter Schnebel, Glossolalie
- 1980, Jerusalem, György Ligeti, Concerto for Violoncello
- 1981, Bruxelles/Gent, Brian Ferneyhough, Time and Motion Study I
- 1981, Bruxelles/Gent, George Crumb, Eleven Echoes of Autumn
- 1981, Bruxelles/Gent, Vinko Globokar, La Tromba è mobile
- 1981, Bruxelles/Gent, Younghi Pagh-Paan, Sori
- 1982, Graz, Hans Werner Henze, Ragtime und Habaneras
- 1982, Graz, Mauricio Kagel, Fürst Igor, Strawinsky (Mauricio Kagel, Manos Tsangaris)
- 1982, Graz, György Ligeti, Atmosphères (Wiener Symphoniker)
- 1982, Graz, John Cage, Credo in US
- 1982, Graz, Pierre Boulez, Improvisation sur Mallarmé II
- 1982, Graz, Karlheinz Stockhausen, Kreuzspiel
- 1982, Graz, Cornelius Cardew, We Think for the Future (Frederic Rzewski)
- 1982, Graz, Luigi Nono, Polifonia, Monodia, Ritmica
- 1982, Graz, Luciano Berio, Entrata/Encore
- 1982, Graz, Sonny Rollins, Quintet
- 1983, Aarhus, Giacinto Scelsi, String Quartet Nr. 4 (Arditti Quartet)
- 1983, Aarhus, Brian Ferneyhough, String Quartet Nr. 2 (Arditti Quartet)
- 1983, Aarhus, Karlheinz Stockhausen, Mantra
- 1983, Aarhus, Steve Reich, Music for Mallet Instruments, Voices and Organ
- 1983, Aarhus, Georges Aperghis, Récitations pour voix seule (Nos. 1,2,3,8,9,10,14)
- 1983, Aarhus, Arvo Pärt, Fratres
- 1983, Aarhus, Louis Andriessen, Workers Union
- 1983, Aarhus, Klaus Huber, Beati Pauperes II (1979)
- 1983, Aarhus, Tristan Murail, Gondwana
- 1983, Aarhus, Ernst Křenek, Arc of Life (op. 234, 1981)
- 1983, Aarhus, Adriana Hölszky, Space
- 1983, Aarhus, Mauricio Kagel, Dressur
- 1984, Toronto/Montreal, Jonty Harrison, Klang
- 1984, Toronto/Montreal, Francis Dhomont, Points de fuite
- 1984, Toronto/Montreal, Unsuk Chin, Gestalten
- 1984, Toronto/Montreal, Isang Yun, Exemplum in memoriam Kwangju
- 1984, Toronto/Montreal, Brian Ferneyhough, Adagissimo (Arditti Quartet)
- 1984, Toronto/Montreal, György Kurtág, Quatuor op. 1 (Arditti Quartet)
- 1985, Netherlands, Klaus Huber, ...Nudo que ansi juntaís...
- 1985, Netherlands, Luciano Berio, Fa-Si
- 1985, Netherlands, Kaija Saariaho, Verblendungen für grosses Orchester und Zuspielband
- 1985, Netherlands, Helmut Lachenmann, Movement – vor der Erstarrung (Ensemble Modern, Lothar Zagrosek)
- 1985, Netherlands, Karlheinz Stockhausen, Klavierstück XII
- 1986, Budapest, Luigi Nono, A Carlo Scarpa architetto ai suoi infiniti possibili
- 1986, Budapest, Samuel Beckett, Acte sans paroles (I. Thirst, II. Mr. A and Mr. B)
- 1986, Budapest, György Ligeti, Aventures
- 1987, Köln/Bonn/Frankfurt am Main, Giacinto Scelsi, Ein Blitzstrahl... und der Himmel öffnete sich (Kölner Rundfunkchor, Kölner Rundfunk-Sinfonieorchester, Hans Zender)
- 1987, Köln/Bonn/Frankfurt am Main, Giacinto Scelsi, Hurqualia – Ein anderes Königreich (Kölner Rundfunk-Sinfonieorchester, Hans Zender)
- 1987, Köln/Bonn/Frankfurt am Main, Giacinto Scelsi, Hymnos (Kölner Rundfunk-Sinfonieorchester, Hans Zender)
- 1987, Köln/Bonn/Frankfurt am Main, Carola Bauckholt, Die faule Vernunft
- 1987, Köln/Bonn/Frankfurt am Main, Hans Zender, Hölderlin lesen
- 1987, Köln/Bonn/Frankfurt am Main, Luigi Nono, Fragmente – Stille an Diotima
- 1987, Köln/Bonn/Frankfurt am Main, The Lost Chord (Phil Minton, Christian Marclay, Günter Christmann, Torsten Müller)
- 1987, Köln/Bonn/Frankfurt am Main, Christian Wolff, Long Peace March (Ensemble Modern, Ingo Metzmacher)
- 1987, Köln/Bonn/Frankfurt am Main, Iannis Xenakis, Jalons (Ensemble InterContemporain, Arturo Tamayo)
- 1987, Köln/Bonn/Frankfurt am Main, Klaus Huber, Erinnere dich an G... (Ensemble InterContemporain, Arturo Tamayo)
- 1987, Köln/Bonn/Frankfurt am Main, Pascal Dusapin, Niobé ou le rocher de Sipyle (Ensemble InterContemporain, Arturo Tamayo)
- 1987, Köln/Bonn/Frankfurt am Main, Michael Gielen, Ein Tag tritt hervor
- 1987, Köln/Bonn/Frankfurt am Main, Mauricio Kagel, Ein Brief
- 1987, Köln/Bonn/Frankfurt am Main, Wolfgang Rihm, Chiffre VII
- 1987, Köln/Bonn/Frankfurt am Main, Heiner Goebbels, Thränen des Vaterlandes
- 1987, Köln/Bonn/Frankfurt am Main, Karlheinz Stockhausen, Xi, Drachenkampf und Argument, Vision und Donnerstags-Abschied (Michaels Abschied), (Karlheinz Stockhausen, Kathinka Pasveer, Markus Stockhausen, Nicholas Isherwood, Mike Svoboda, Andreas Boettger, Julian Pike, Michael Obst, Michèle Noiret, Jean Christian Jalon)
- 1988, Hongkong, Morton Feldman, Palais de mari
- 1988, Hongkong, John Cage, Song Books I-II
- 1988, Hongkong, Brian Ferneyhough, String Quartet Nr. 3
- 1988, Hongkong, Philip Glass, Opening
- 1988, Hongkong, Gérard Grisey, Talea
- 1988, Hongkong, Hans Werner Henze, El Cimarrón
- 1988, Hongkong, Liza Lim, Pompes Funèbres
- 1988, Hongkong, Helmut Lachenmann, Staub
- 1988, Hongkong, Tan Dun, In Distance
- 1988, Hongkong, Toru Takemitsu, Orion and the Pleiades
- 1989, Amsterdam, Unsuk Chin, Canzone II
- 1989, Amsterdam, Unsuk Chin, Gradus ad infinitum* 1989, Amsterdam, Stefano Gervasoni, Un recitativo
- 1989, Amsterdam, Fausto Romitelli, Have your trip
- 1989, Amsterdam, Kaija Saariaho, Nymphea (Arditti Quartet)
- 1990, Oslo, Uros Rojko, Der Atem der verletzten Zeit
- 1990, Oslo, Iannis Xenakis, Epicycles
- 1990, Oslo, Alfred Schnittke, Concerto Grosso I
- 1990, Oslo, Giacinto Scelsi, Ygghur
- 1990, Oslo, Louis Andriessen, La Voce
- 1990, Oslo, John Adams, Shaker Loops
- 1990, Oslo, Daniel Ott, Zampugn
- 1990, Oslo, Mauricio Kagel, Musik für Tasteninstrumente und Orchester
- 1990, Oslo, Toru Takemitsu, Rain Spell
- 1990, Oslo, György Ligeti, Ramifications
- 1990, Oslo, Krzysztof Penderecki, Viola concerto
- 1990, Oslo, Vinko Globokar, Kolo
- 1990, Oslo, Tristan Murail, Allégories
- 1990, Oslo, Gérard Grisey, Partiels
- 1991, Zürich, Rolf Liebermann, 3 x 1 = CH + X
- 1991, Zürich, Klaus Huber, Erniedrigt – geknechtet – verlassen – verachtet...
- 1991, Zürich, Heinz Holliger, Scardanelli-Zyklus
- 1991, Zürich, Karlheinz Stockhausen, In Freundschaft
- 1991, Zürich, Karlheinz Stockhausen, Mikrophonie I
- 1991, Zürich, Wolfgang Rihm, Hölderlin-Fragmente
- 1991, Zürich, Friedrich Cerha, 2nd String Quartet
- 1991, Zürich, Liza Lim, Voodoo Child
- 1991, Zürich, Mauricio Kagel, Sonant
- 1992, Warszawa, Krzysztof Penderecki, The Devils of Loudun
- 1992, Warszawa, Matthias Pintscher, 2nd String Quartet
- 1992, Warszawa, Daniel Ott, Molto semplicemente
- 1992, Warszawa, Hans Wüthrich-Mathez, Annäherungen an Gegenwart
- 1992, Warszawa, Henryk Mikołaj Górecki, Beatus Vir
- 1993, Mexiko-City, Helmut Lachenmann, Reigen seliger Geister (Arditti Quartet)
- 1993, Mexiko-City, Brian Ferneyhough, 4th String Quartet (Arditti Quartet)
- 1993, Mexiko-City, Hilda Paredes, Oxkintok
- 1993, Mexiko-City, Salvatore Sciarrino, Esplorazione del bianco
- 1993, Mexiko-City, Conlon Nancarrow, Estudios #21 (canon X), #3a (from Boogie-Woogie Suite), #36, #12, #29, #43, Cuarteto No. 1, #37, #41c, Contraption #1, Toccata for violin and mechanic piano, Cuarteto No. 3 (Arditti Quartet)
- 1994, Stockholm, Caspar Johannes Walter, Durchscheinende Etüden, Simultankonzept IV
- 1994, Stockholm, Fausto Romitelli, La Sabbia del Tempo
- 1994, Stockholm, Uros Rojko, Et puis plus rien le rève
- 1994, Stockholm, Klaus Huber, Des Dichters Pflug
- 1994, Stockholm, Rolf Riehm, Weeds in Ophelia's Hair
- 1994, Stockholm, Henri Pousseur, Scambi
- 1994, Stockholm, Luciano Berio, Perspectives
- 1995, Ruhrgebiet, Peter Eötvös, Psychokosmos
- 1995, Ruhrgebiet, György Kurtág, Grabstein für Stephan op. 15c (Kölner Rundfunk-Sinfonieorchester)
- 1995, Ruhrgebiet, György Kurtág, Stele op. 33 (Kölner Rundfunk-Sinfonieorchester)
- 1995, Ruhrgebiet, Luigi Nono, Caminantes ... Ayacucho (Experimentalstudio der Heinrich-Strobel-Stiftung des SWF)
- 1995, Ruhrgebiet, George Crumb, Echoes of Time and the River, Four Processionals for Orchestra
- 1995, Ruhrgebiet, Morton Feldman, Piano and Orchestra
- 1995, Ruhrgebiet, Giacinto Scelsi, Hymnos
- 1995, Ruhrgebiet, Olga Neuwirth, Spleen
- 1995, Ruhrgebiet, Georg Friedrich Haas, Nacht-Schatten (Klangforum Wien, Peter Rundel)
- 1995, Ruhrgebiet, Beat Furrer, Studie II – A un moment de terre perdu (Klangforum Wien, Peter Rundel)
- 1995, Ruhrgebiet, Hans Werner Henze, Symphonie Nr. 7 (BBC Symphony Orchestra London, Peter Eötvös)
- 1995, Ruhrgebiet, John Cage, FOUR for string quartet (Arditti Quartet)
- 1995, Ruhrgebiet, Sam Hayden, Picking Up the Pieces
- 1996, København, Caspar Johannes Walter, Durchscheinende Etüden I-VIII/c
- 1996, København, Olga Neuwirth, Sans Soleil
- 1996, København, Unsuk Chin, Akrostichon-Wortspiel
- 1996, København, Francis Dhomont, Espace/Escape
- 1996, København, Jonathan Harvey, Advaya
- 1996, København, Carola Bauckholt, In gewohnter Umgebung II
- 1996, København, Alban Berg, Lulu
- 1996, København, Mauricio Kagel, Interview avec D.
- 1996, København, Toshio Hosokawa, Interim
- 1996, København, Elliott Carter, Con Leggerezza Pensosa
- 1997, Seoul, Gilbert Amy, Trois Scènes
- 1997, Seoul, Brian Ferneyhough, On Stellar Magnitudes
- 1997, Seoul, Mauricio Kagel, Westen
- 1997, Seoul, Carola Bauckholt, Treibstoff
- 1997, Seoul, Gérard Grisey, Les Chants de l'Amour
- 1997, Seoul, Thomas Kessler, Voice Control
- 1997, Seoul, John Cage, Music for Five
- 1997, Seoul, Isang Yun, Violin Concerto
- 1998, Manchester, Peter Maxwell Davies, Worldes Blis (BBC Symphony Orchestra London, Sir Peter Maxwell Davies)
- 1998, Manchester, Sofia Gubaidulina, De profundis
- 1998, Manchester, Harrison Birtwistle, Pulse Shadows (Arditti Quartet)
- 1998, Manchester, Luciano Berio, Glosse (Arditti Quartet)
- 1998, Manchester, Brian Ferneyhough, String Trio (Arditti Quartet)
- 1998, Manchester, Just before (Rosas Dance Company, Anne Teresa De Keersmaeker), Ictus Ensemble,
- 1998, Manchester, Beat Furrer, Time Out
- 1998, Manchester, Luciano Berio, Ekphrasis (continuo II), (Hallé Orchestra, Kent Nagano)
- 1998, Manchester, Kaija Saariaho, Château de l'âme, (Hallé Orchestra, Kent Nagano)
- 1998, Manchester, Salvatore Sciarrino, Waiting for the Wing
- 1998, Manchester, Olivier Messiaen, Cinq Rechants (BBC Singers)
- 1998, Manchester, Mauricio Kagel, Orchestrion-Straat (London Sinfonietta, James Wood)
- 1999, Romania/Moldavia, Rebecca Saunders, Into the Blue
- 2000, Luxembourg, Morton Feldman, For Philip Guston
- 2000, Luxembourg, Moritz Eggert, Der Andere (after the novel The Outsider by H.P. Lovecraft)
- 2000, Luxembourg, Mauricio Kagel, Duodramen
- 2000, Luxembourg, Tan Dun, The Gate, Orchestral Theatre IV (BBC Symphony Orchestra, Tan Dun)
- 2002, Hongkong, Krzysztof Penderecki, Concerto Grosso
- 2002, Hongkong, Terry Riley, In C
- 2002, Hongkong, Thomas Adès, Arcadiana
- 2002, Hongkong, Shintaro Imai, La litte bleue
- 2002, Hongkong, Kaija Saariaho, Graal Theatre
- 2002, Hongkong, Guo Wenjing, Melodies of Western Yunnan
- 2003, Slovenia, John Zorn, Contes de fées
- 2003, Slovenia, Friedrich Cerha, Five Pieces
- 2003, Slovenia, Krzysztof Penderecki, Sinfonietta No. 2 (RTV Slovenia Symphony Orchestra)
- 2003, Slovenia, Philippe Manoury, Metal (Percussions de Strasbourg)
- 2003, Slovenia, Klaus Huber, Intarsi
- 2003, Slovenia, Vinko Globokar, Zlom, Blinde Zeit, Eppure si muove (Klangforum Wien, Vinko Globokar)
- 2004, Switzerland, Carola Bauckholt, Hubschrauber
- 2004, Switzerland, Oscar Bianchi, De rerum natura
- 2004, Switzerland, Elliott Carter, Dialogues pour piano et orchestre (Orchestre de Chambre de Lausanne)
- 2004, Switzerland, Unsuk Chin, Violin Concerto
- 2004, Switzerland, Brian Ferneyhough, Opus Contra Naturam (Ensemble Contrechamps)
- 2004, Switzerland, Lars Petter Hagen, Voices to voices, lip to lip
- 2004, Switzerland, Michael Jarrell, Abschied (Ensemble Contrechamps)
- 2004, Switzerland, Heinz Holliger, Turm Musik (Orchestre de Chambre de Lausanne)
- 2005, Zagreb, Aaron Cassidy, Metallic Dust
- 2005, Zagreb, Panayiotis Kokoras, Holophony
- 2005, Zagreb, Wolfgang Rihm, Chiffre VI
- 2005, Zagreb, Fausto Romitelli, Amok Koma
- 2005, Zagreb, Beat Furrer, Presto con fuoco
- 2005, Zagreb, Uri Caine, Trio
- 2006, Stuttgart, German Toro-Pérez, Stadtplan von New York (ensemble mosaik, Enno Poppe)
- 2006, Stuttgart, Mauricio Kagel, Phonophonie
- 2006, Stuttgart, Johannes Kreidler, RAM microsystems
- 2006, Stuttgart, Panayiotis Kokoras, Paranormal
- 2006, Stuttgart, Dai Fujikura, Okeanos Breeze (Ensemble recherche)
- 2006, Stuttgart, Jennifer Walshe, meanwhile, back at the ranch
- 2006, Stuttgart, Fausto Romitelli, An Index of Metals (Ensemble musikFabrik, Barbara Hannigan)
- 2006, Stuttgart, Julio Estrada, Murmullos del páramo (Neue Vocalsolisten Stuttgart, Mike Svoboda, Ko Ishikawa, Stefano Scodanibbio, Llorenç Barber, Magnus Andersson)
- 2013, Kosice/Bratislava/Wien, Unsuk Chin, snagS&Snarls
- 2013, Kosice/Bratislava/Wien, Beat Furrer, Phasma
- 2013, Kosice/Bratislava/Wien, Arvo Pärt, Spiegel im Spiegel
- 2013, Kosice/Bratislava/Wien, Kaija Saariaho, Aile du songe
- 2013, Kosice/Bratislava/Wien, Jennifer Walshe, Silently & Very fast* 2014, Wroclaw, Thomas Vaquié, O (Omicron)
- 2014, Wroclaw, Frederik Neyrinck, Contr'Action II (Klangforum Wien)
- 2014, Wroclaw, Samuel Holloway, Village (Klangforum Wien)
- 2014, Wroclaw, Pierluigi Billone, Eben und anders (Klangforum Wien)
- 2014, Wroclaw, Peter Eötvös, Angels in America
- 2014, Wroclaw, Krzysztof Penderecki, Paradise Lost
- 2014, Wroclaw, Ryoji Ikeda, Datamatics
- 2014, Wroclaw, György Ligeti, Lux Aeterna
- 2014, Wroclaw, Stefan Prins, Piano Hero #1
- 2015, Ljubljana, Hector Parra, inFALL
- 2015, Ljubljana, Vito Žuraj, Hawk-Eye
- 2016, Tongyeong, Isao Matsushita, Prayer of the Firmament (Changwon Philharmonic Orchestra)
- 2016, Tongyeong, Pierre Boulez, Dérive (Hong Kong New Music Ensemble)
- 2016, Tongyeong, Randolph Peters, Hallucinations (Gyeonggi Philharmonic Orchestra)
- 2018, Beijing, Jia Guoping, The Pine-soughing Valley (China National Symphony Orchestra)
- 2018, Beijing, Caleb Burhans, Escape Wisconsin (Alarm Remix) (Alarm Will Sound)
- 2018, Beijing, Guo Wenjing, Wild Fire (Bamboo Flute Concerto Nr. 2) (Hanzhou Philharmonic Orchestra)
- 2019, Tallinn, Wim Henderickx, Blossoming. Three Prayers for a Better World (Estonian Philharmonic Chamber Choir, Kaspars Putnins)
- 2019, Tallinn, Alexander Schubert, Star Me Kitten
- 2019, Tallinn, Stefan Prins, Generation Kill – offspring 1
- 2019, Tallinn, Liza Lim, Burning House
