= Roberto Gerhard =

Spanish and British composer (1896–1970)

- Born: Robert Gerhard i Ottenwaelder; 25 September 1896; Valls, Kingdom of Spain
- Died: 5 January 1970 (aged 73); Cambridge, England
- Resting place: Ascension Parish Burial Ground
- Occupations: Composer; musical scholar; writer
- Years active: 1923–1969
- Spouse: Leopoldina Feichtegger

Robert Gerhard i Ottenwaelder (Catalan pronunciation: [ruˈβɛɾd ʒəˈɾaɾt]; 25 September 1896 – 5 January 1970) was a Spanish and British composer, musical scholar, and writer, generally known outside his native region of Catalonia as Roberto Gerhard.

== Early life ==
Gerhard was born in Valls, near Tarragona, Spain. His father was of German and Swiss ancestry; his mother was from Alsace-Lorraine.

He studied piano with Enrique Granados and composition with scholar-composer Felip Pedrell, teacher of Isaac Albéniz, Granados and Manuel de Falla. Gerhard visited Falla in Granada, but dismissed him as a possible teacher and decided to shut himself away in a Catalan farmhouse to reflect on his professional future and concentrate on his work. Seeking systematicity, he turned his gaze to German avant-garde music and decided to send a long letter to the composer Arnold Schoenberg, enclosing his compositions, on 21 October 1923, begging to be accepted as his pupil.

After the latter's acceptance, Gerhard immediately left for Vienna. He was Schoenberg's only Spanish pupil. Gerhard studied with Schoenberg in Vienna and Berlin between 1923 and 1928, and the teacher-pupil relationship became a lifelong friendship, as is shown in the complete correspondence published between the two composers.

== Career ==
In 1928, Gerhard returned to Barcelona. He devoted his energies to new music through concerts and journalism, in conjunction with the flourishing literary and artistic avant-garde of Catalonia. He befriended Joan Miró and Pablo Casals, brought Schoenberg and Anton Webern to Barcelona, and was the principal organizer of the 1936 ISCM Festival. He also collected, edited, and performed folksongs and Spanish music from the Renaissance to the eighteenth century.

Gerhard supported the Republican cause in the Spanish Civil War (as musical adviser to the Minister of Fine Arts in the Catalan Government and a member of the Republican government's Social Music Council). He was forced to flee to France in 1939 and later that year settled in Cambridge, England. Until the death of Francisco Franco, his music was virtually proscribed in Spain, to which he never returned except for holidays. Apart from scores for the BBC and in the theatre, Gerhard's compositions of the 1940s were explicitly related to aspects of Spanish and Catalan culture, beginning in 1940 with a Homenaje a Pedrell, a symphony in memory of Pedrell, and the first version of the ballet Don Quixote. The period culminated with The Duenna, a Spanish opera on an English play by Richard Brinsley Sheridan, which is set in Spain. The Covent Garden production of Don Quixote and the BBC broadcasts of The Duenna popularized Gerhard's reputation in the UK, but not in Spain.

During the 1950s, the legacy of Schoenbergian serialism, a background presence in these overtly national works, engendered an increasingly radical approach to composition which, by the 1960s, placed Gerhard firmly in the ranks of the avant-garde.

== Death ==
From the early 1950s Gerhard suffered from a heart condition which would eventually end his life. He died in Cambridge in 1970 and is buried at the Parish of the Ascension Burial Ground in Cambridge, with his wife Leopoldina 'Poldi' Feichtegger Gerhard (1903–1994).

His archive is kept at Cambridge University Library. Other personal papers of Gerhard are preserved in the Biblioteca de Catalunya. The vast majority of the correspondence between Gerhard and Arnold Schoenberg can be found at the Arnold Schönberg Center.

== Music ==
=== Stylistic evolution ===
For twenty years – first in Barcelona and then in exile in England – Gerhard cultivated and contributed to a modern tonal idiom with a pronounced Spanish-folkloric orientation that descended on the one hand from Pedrell and Falla, and on the other from contemporary composers such as Bartók and Stravinsky. This was the idiom whose major achievements included the ballets Soirées de Barcelone and Don Quixote, the Violin Concerto and the opera The Duenna.

Gerhard often said that he stood by the sound of his music: 'in music the sense is in the sound'. Yet dazzling as their scoring is, his last works are in no sense a mere succession of sonic events. Their forms are meticulously organized and several make use of his special development of serialism where a twelve-tone pitch series, governing intervallic relations, interacts with a twelvefold time series governing the music's duration and proportions.

=== Selected list of works ===
Gerhard's most significant works, apart from those already mentioned, include four symphonies (the Third, Collages, for orchestra and tape), the Concerto for Orchestra, concertos for violin, piano and harpsichord, the cantata The Plague (after Albert Camus), the ballets Pandora and Ariel, and pieces for a wide variety of chamber ensembles, including Sardanas for the indigenous Catalan street band, the cobla. He was perhaps the first important composer of electronic music in Britain; his incidental music for the 1955 Stratford-on-Avon King Lear – one of many such commissions for the Royal Shakespeare Company – was the first electronic score for the British stage.

==== Symphonies ====
- Symphony Homenaje a Pedrell (1941)
- Symphony No. 1 (1952–53)
- Symphony No. 2 (1957–59); recomposition as Metamorphosis, unfinished (1967–68)
- Symphony No. 3 Collages (for orchestra and tape) (1960)
- Symphony No. 4 New York (1967)
- Symphony No. 5 (fragment only) (1969)
- (for Chamber Symphony Leo see "Chamber music")

==== Stage works ====
- Ariel, ballet (1934)
- Soirées de Barcelone, ballet in three tableaux (1937–39; edited and orchestration completed by Malcolm MacDonald, 1996)
- Don Quixote, ballet (original version 1940–41, rev. 1947–49)
- Alegrias, Divertissement flamenco (1942)
- Pandora, ballet (1943–44, orch. 1944–45)
- The Duenna, English opera after Sheridan (1947–49). Radio performance was in 1949, at BBC; its first scenic performance was in 1992 at Teatro de la Zarzuela, Madrid, and Gran Teatre del Liceu, Barcelona. The Bielefeld Opera and conductor Geoffrey Moull performed The Duenna in a new production in 1994. The Wiener Zeitung at the time remarked that the work is "a rediscovered stroke of genius".
- El barberillo de Lavapies, arrangement and orchestration of the zarzuela (1874) by Francisco Barbieri (1954)
- Lamparilla, German-language Singspiel loosely based on El barberillo de Lavapies with additional music and original overture by Gerhard (1955–56)

==== Concertos ====
- Concertino for string orchestra (1929)
- Violin Concerto (1942–43)
- Concerto for Piano and String Orchestra (1951)
- Concerto for Harpsichord, String Orchestra and Percussion (1955–56)
- Concerto for Orchestra (1965)

==== Orchestral works ====
- Albada, Interludi i Dansa (1936)
- Dances from Don Quixote (1940-41)
- Pedrelliana (En memoria) (1941; revised 1954)
- Epithalamion (1966)
- Various suites from Soirées de Barcelone, Alegrias, Pandora

==== Chamber and instrumental music ====
- Sonatine a Carlos, piano (1914)
- Trio in B major for violin, cello and piano (1918)
- Trio No. 2 for violin, cello and piano (1918)
- Dos Apunts, piano (1921–22)
- 3 string quartets composed up to 1928 (all lost; No. 3 (1928) was reworked as the Concertino for strings)
- Sonata, clarinet and piano (1928; also version for bass clarinet and piano)
- Wind Quintet (1928, his first serial work)
- Andantino, clarinet, violin and piano (period 1928–29)
- String Quartet No. 1 (1950–55)
- Sonata, viola and piano (1948; recomposed 1956 as sonata for cello and piano)
- Capriccio, solo flute (1949)
- 3 Impromptus, piano (1950)
- Secret People (study for the film score) for clarinet, violin and piano (1951–52)
- Nonet (1956–57)
- Fantasia, guitar (1957)
- String Quartet No. 2 (1961–62)
- Concert for 8 (1962)
- Chaconne, violin solo (1959)
- Hymnody for large wind ensemble, two pianos and percussion (1963)
- For whom the bell tolls, for solo guitar (1965)
- Gemini, Duo for violin and piano (1966)
- Libra, sextet (1968)
- Leo, Chamber Symphony (1969)

==== Vocal works ====
- L'infantament meravellós de Shahrazada Song-cycle for voice and piano, Op. 1 (1916–18)
- Verger de les galanies for voice and piano (1917–18)
- 7 Haiku for voice and ensemble (1922 rev. 1958)
- 14 Cançons populars catalanes for voice and piano (1928–29; six numbers orchestrated 1931 as 6 Cançons Populars Catalanes)
- L'alta naixenca del Rei en Jaume, cantata for soprano, baritone, chorus and orchestra (1932)
- Cancionero de Pedrell for voice and piano or chamber orchestra (1941)
- 3 Canciones Toreras for voice and orchestra (c. 1943) [composed under pseudonym "Juan Serralonga"]
- 6 Chansons populaires françaises for voice and piano (1944)
- The Akond of Swat for voice and percussion (1954)
- Cantares for voice and guitar (1962; incorporates Fantasia for guitar)
- The Plague, cantata for narrator, chorus and orchestra, after Camus (1963–64)

==== Electronic music ====
- Audiomobiles I-IV (1958–59)
- Lament for the death of Bullfighter for speaker and tape (1959)
- Caligula (1960–61)
- 10 Pieces for tape (c. 1961)
- Sculptures I-V (1963)
- DNA in Reflection (1963)
- Anger of Achilles (1964) with Delia Derbyshire
- also tape component in Symphony No.3 and in many film, radio and theatre scores

==== Fantasias on themes from Zarzuelas ====
(for light orchestra; composed c. 1943 under the pseudonym "Juan Serralonga")

- Cadiz, after Chuca & Valverde (1943)
- Gigantes y Cabezudos, after Caballero (c. 1943)
- La Viejecita, after Caballero (c. 1943)

==== Film music ====
- Secret People (1952)
- This Sporting Life (1963)

== Articles and broadcasts by Gerhard ==
- 'Roberto Gerhard's Symphony': Radio Times, Oct 23, 1959, p. 9 (An introduction to the Second Symphony, which was commissioned by the BBC and first performed and broadcast on Oct 28, 1959. Gerhard also contributed an item on the work to 'Music Magazine' on the BBC Home Service, Oct 25, 1959.)
- Gerhard worked with Lionel Salter on a radio series, The Heritage of Spain, broadcast on the BBC Third Programme in 26 parts from January 1954.

== Sources ==
- Monty Adkins, Michael Russ. The Roberto Gerhard Companion, Ashgate (2013) ISBN 978-1-40944-515-9
- Gerhard, Roberto, and Meirion Bowen. 2000. Gerhard on Music: Selected Writings, edited by Meirion Bowen. Aldershot [Hants, UK] and Burlington [Vermont]: Ashgate. ISBN 0-7546-0009-2
- Joaquim Homs. Robert Gerhard y su obra. (Ethos-Musica; 16). Universidad de Oviedo, 1987. ISBN 84-505-6080-2
- Homs, Joaquim. 1991. Robert Gerhard i la seva obra. Barcelona: Biblioteca de Catalunya. ISBN 84-7845-109-9
- Proceedings of the 1st International Roberto Gerhard Conference : May 27–28th 2010. England: Centre for Research in New Music, University of Huddersfield, 2010. ISBN 978-1-86218-088-8
- London Sinfonietta. 1974. Programme book for The complete Instrumental and Chamber Music of Arnold Schoenberg and Roberto Gerhard. London: London Sinfonietta.
- Paloma Ortiz-de-Urbina. Arnold Schönberg und Roberto Gerhard. Briefwechsel. Kritische Ausgabe. Peter Lang, Berna, 2019. ISBN 978-3-0343-3754-0), doi:10.3726/b15301I Open Access: https://www.peterlang.com/document/1110910
- Paloma Ortiz-de-Urbina. Arnold Schoenberg and Roberto Gerhard. Correspondence. Critical Edition, Generalitat de Catalunya, Departament de Cultura, Biblioteca de Catalunya, Barcelona, 2020. ISBN 978-84-18199-07-3.
- Monty Adkins, Rachel Mann. Roberto Gerhard. Re-Appraising a Musical Visionary in Exile. Proceedings of the British Academy, Oxford, Oxford University Press, 2022
- The Score, September 1956. On the occasion of Gerhard's birthday, with articles by Donald Mitchell, Norman Del Mar, John Gardner, Roman Vlad, David Drew, Laurence Picken and Gerhard himself.
- Routh, Francis. Contemporary British Music (1972), pp. 175-187.
