= 1936 International Society for Contemporary Music Festival =

The 1936 International Society for Contemporary Music Festival was the fourteenth edition of the festival. Held in Barcelona from 19 to 23 April 1936, just three months before the outbreak of the Spanish Civil War, it was one of the last major cultural events of the Second Spanish Republic. This edition is best remembered for the posthumous world premiere of Alban Berg's Violin Concerto on its inaugural day.

== Programme ==
The compositions were selected in Barcelona from 28 December 1935 to 1 January 1936 by a jury formed by Ernest Ansermet, Edward J. Dent, Joan Lamote de Grignon, Anton Webern and Bolesław Woytowicz. Knudåge Riisager could not attend the meeting.

Date and location	Composers	Compositions	Performers
April 19, 11:15; Palau de les Belles Arts	Wladimir Vogel; Josep Maria Ruera; Ricard Lamote de Grignon; Florent Schmitt	Devise; Three Symphonic Movements; Joan de l'Os; Dyonisiaques	Mercedes Plantada, soprano; Ricardo Fusté, baritone; Conrado Giralt, bass Orfeó de Sant, Orfeó Montserrat de Gràcia, Schola Cantorum de Sant Miquel Arcàngel; Barcelona Municipal Band – Ricard Lamote de Grignon
April 19, 17:30; Palau de la Música Catalana	Edmund von Borck; Robert Gerhard; Ernst Krenek; Alban Berg	Prelude and Fugue; Ariel; Fragments from Karl V Violin Concerto; Fragments from Wozzeck	Leonor Meyer, soprano Louis Krasner, violin Pau Casals Orchestra – Ernest Ansermet, Hermann Scherchen^{1}
April 20, 22:00; Palau de la Música Catalana	Robert Blum; Ludwig Zenk; Mark Brunswick; Václav Kaprál; Jacques Ibert	Three Psalms; Piano Sonata; Two Movements for Quartet; Lullabies; Concertino da camera	Alice Frey and Jurmila Vavrdová, sopranos Robert Georg, piano; Sigurd Raschèr, saxophone Galimir Quartet; Karel Ančerl, Ernest Ansermet and Jacques Ibert, conductors
April 21, 18:00; Casal del Metge	Walter Piston; Egon Wellesz; Benjamin Britten; André Souris; Manuel Blancafort; Béla Bartók	Flute Sonata; Sonnet for soprano and quartet Suite for violin and piano Quelques airs de Clarisse de Jurenville; Les ombres perennes String Quartet No. 5	Concepción Badía and Panny Cleve, sopranos; Marie Lancelot, contraltro Antonio Brosa, violin; Esteban Gratacós, flute Benjamin Britten, Winifred Hooke, Alejandro Vilalta, Pere Vallribera, piano New Hungarian Quartet
April 22, 22:00; Palau de la Música Catalana	Carl Ruggles; Albert Roussel; Frank Martin; Rodolfo Halffter; Marcel Mihalovici; Roman Palester	Sun Treader; Symphony No. 4 Piano Concerto; Don Lindo de Almería; Violin Concerto (Quasi una Fantasia); Polish Dances	Walter Frey, piano; Stefan Frankel, violin Madrid Philharmonic – Ernest Ansermet, Bartolomé Pérez Casas and Pedro Sanjuán
April 23, 22:00; Palau de la Música Catalana	Lennox Berkeley; Karl Alfred Deutsch; Karol Szymanowski; Federico Elizalde; Lars-Erik Larsson	Overture; Symphony; Violin Concerto No. 2 Sinfonia Concertante; Concert Overture No. 2	Leopoldo Querol, piano; Stefan Frankel, violin Madrid Symphony – Enrique Fernández Arbós

^{1} Anton Webern was scheduled to conduct Berg's Concerto and Krenek's Karl V, but he was replaced respectively by Scherchen and Ansermet, who also conducted the other three compositions.
