= Doming Lam =

Macau composer (1926–2023)

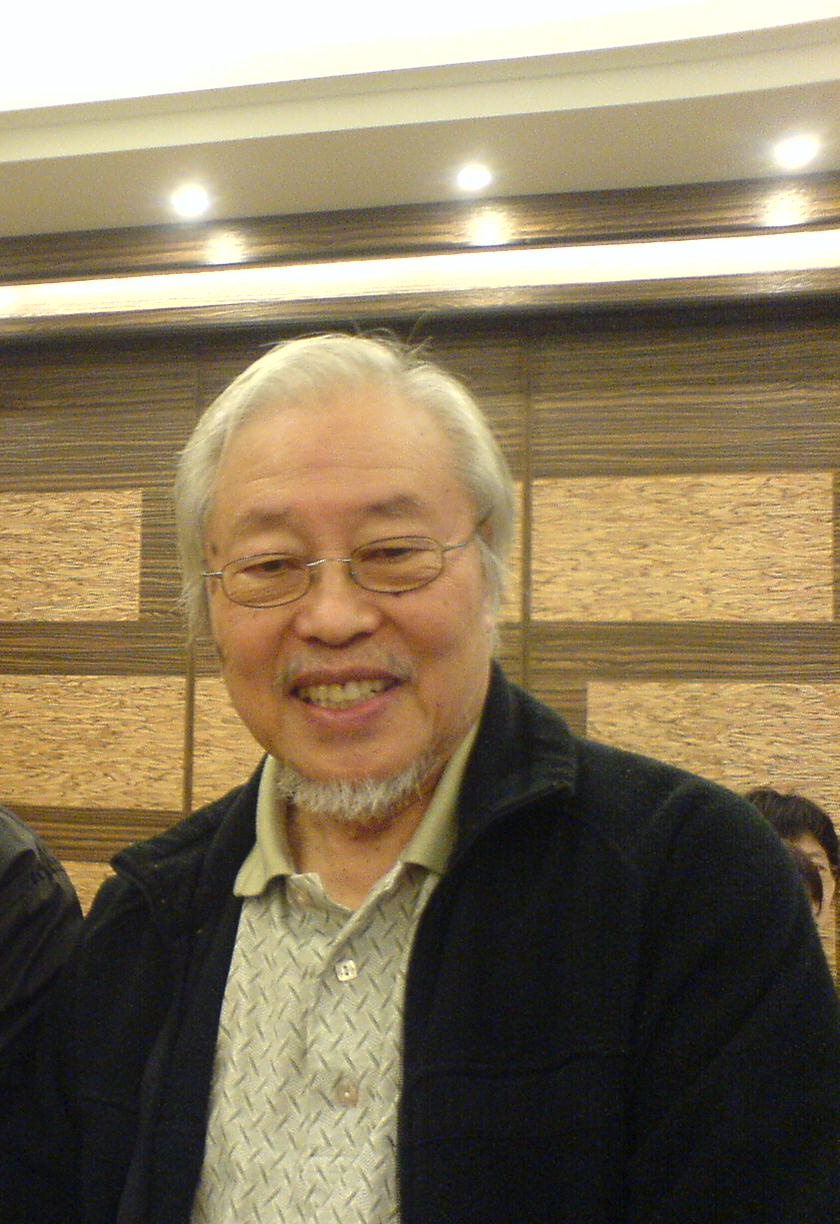
- Born: 5 August 1926; Macau
- Died: 11 January 2023 (aged 96)
- Occupation: Composer
- Known for: Contribution to Hong Kong music industry
- Title: Honorary President of Hong Kong Composers' Guild

Doming Ngok-pui Lam (Chinese: 林樂培; Cantonese Yale: làm ngohk pùi; 5 August 1926 – 11 January 2023) was a music composer born in Macau. He was named as "the father of Hong Kong modern music" for his contribution to the music industry of Hong Kong.

== Background ==
Lam studied music in Toronto (The Royal Conservatory of Music 1954-1958) and Los Angeles (University of Southern California 1960-1963). He travelled extensively around the world to international conferences, seminars, workshops, festivals and Rostrums, in order to maintain his sensitivity and knowledge in the music world.

From 1964 to 1994, Lam served actively in Hong Kong as a composer, conductor, lecturer, journalist, protector of performing rights, promoter of music exchanges in Asia and around the globe. His objective in writing music was to create modern Chinese music by applying avant garde technique on traditional roots.

Lam died on 11 January 2023, at the age of 96.

== Honours and awards ==
In the 1999 Culture Day, Lam was named one of the five Asian composing masters by the music circle in Tokyo. Lam is the first Macau-born composer to be included in the prestigious Grove Dictionary of Music and Musicians. Lam was named Honorary Member of the International Society for Contemporary Music (ISCM) at its World Music Days in Hong Kong in 2007.
