= 1931 International Society for Contemporary Music Festival =

The 1931 International Society for Contemporary Music Festival was the ninth edition of the society's annual festival. It was held in London and Oxford from 23 to 28 July 1931 and consisted of six concerts featuring 29 compositions from thirteen countries, including one opera. Eleven works were broadcast by the BBC, bringing the festival to national attention.

Aaron Copland was critical of the event, criticizing that the ISCM Festival had become a means "to consecrate the glory of established reputations and to call to the attention of an international public the music of certain newer composers" rather than supporting the most revolutionary musical tendencies.

== Programme ==
Date and location	Composers	Compositions
July 23; Sheldonian Theatre (Oxford)	Lev Knipper; Roger Sessions; Józef Koffler; Jean Huré; Egon Wellesz; Jan Maklakiewicz; Ernesto Halffter	Little Lyric Suite; Piano Sonata No. 1 String Trio; Ame en peine Three spiritual chorals Japanese Songs; Sinfonietta
July 24; New Theatre (Oxford)	Ralph Vaughan Williams; Erwin Schulhoff; Constant Lambert	Job: A Masque for Dancing; La Sonnambule; Pomona
July 25; Holywell Music Room (Oxford)	Paul Hindemith	Wir bauen eine Stadt
July 25; Sheldonian Theatre (Oxford)	Marcel Delannoy; Otto Jokl; Jean Cartan; Eugene Aynsley Goossens; Mario Pilati	String Quartet; Piano Sonatina; Sonatina for Flute and Clarinet; Violin Sonata No. 2 Piano Quintet
July 27; Queen's Hall (London)	Roman Palester; Anton Webern; Virgilio Mortari; Vladimir Dukelsky; Constant Lambert; George Gershwin	Symphonic Music; Symphony; Rhapsody; Symphony No. 2 Music for orchestra An American in Paris
July 28; Queen's Hall (London)	Juan José Castro; Fernand Quinet; Karol Szymanowski; Ferenc Szabó; Ralph Vaughan Williams; Wladimir Vogel; Albert Roussel	Tres trozos sinfónicos Three Symphonic Movements; Kurpie Songs; Song of the Wolves; Benedicite; Two Studies for orchestra Psalm 80
