= List of people educated at Bunce Court School =

This is an incomplete list of the hundreds of people who attended Bunce Court School, a German-Jewish private boarding school in the village of Otterden, Kent, England that was founded in Herrlingen, Germany in 1926 as Landschulheim Herrlingen. Because most of its pupils were Jewish, the founder of the school moved it to England in 1933. Beginning with 65 children, it grew as other children were sent to safety by their parents, some on one of the Kindertransports. After World War II, the school took in child survivors of Nazi concentration camps. The school closed in 1948.

This list contains the names of people who attended both Bunce Court (officially called New Herrlingen School) and its original incarnation in Germany. People are listed by surname according to how they were known as pupils. Later names are in parentheses. If only one name is known, only one is given.

== A ==
- Auerbach, Frank

== B ==
- Baruch, Lothar (Leslie Baruch Brent)

== H ==
- Hoffnung, Gerhard (Gerard Hoffnung)

== L ==
- Leonhard, Wladimir (Wolfgang Leonhard) – only attended Landschulheim Herrlingen

== M ==
- Marcus, Frank
- Mayer, Thomas
- Meyer, Peter (Peter Morley)

== R ==
- Römer, Michael (Michael Roemer)

== S ==
- Sonnenfeldt, Helmut
- Sonnenfeldt, Heinz Wolfgang Richard (Richard W. Sonnenfeldt)
