= Hans Joseph Meyer =

German refugee and teacher (1913–2009)

Hans Joseph Meyer

Hans Meyer (1913–2009) was a German-born teacher at Bunce Court School in the County of Kent, England. He taught at the school from 1934 until it closed in 1948. In 1940, Meyer and several others from the school were forced to go to a British internment camp. Learning that several of his pupils were being deported to a camp in Australia, Meyer volunteered to accompany them, ending up on the HMT Dunera.

== Biographical details ==
Meyer was born in Mainz, Germany, the son of Jewish parents. His father ran a hardware store. He died in 1932; his mother was sent to Theresienstadt concentration camp, where she perished.

After attending gymnasium, he began studying medicine until he was prohibited from attending university by the Nazis. In 1934, at the age of 21, he left Germany and moved to England, where he began working for Anna Essinger at Bunce Court School. The school's original home was in Herrlingen, Germany, but after it came under scrutiny from Nazi authorities and her senior pupils were prohibited from taking the exams for the abitur, Essinger evacuated the entire school to England.

Bunce Court's enrollment was primarily made up of refugees from Nazi Germany and countries under Nazi control. Alumni Leslie Baruch Brent, who arrived on the first Kindertransport, and Eric Bourne credited Meyer with having been very empathetic with the pupils, a large number of whom ultimately lost their families. Years later, Meyer said that at that time, teaching was less important than being a "sympathetic human being". Bunce Court pupils were on a first name basis with their teachers or were called nicknames made up by the children. Meyer's nickname was "Meyerlein", an affectionate diminutive, meaning "little Meyer".

Meyer met and married another teacher at the school, Hannah Goldschmidt and had two sons, Joseph and Tyll, who died in an accident at age 21. His wife's nickname at the school was "Hago", for the first two letters of her first and maiden names.

After the British government issued Defence Regulation 18b and then in 1940 determined that all German-born males over the age of 16 had to be interned, Meyer and others from the school, including several pupils, as enemy aliens, were forced to leave the school for an internment camp in Huyton, a suburb of Liverpool. When Meyer learned that some of the boys from Bunce Court were to be deported to Australia, he volunteered to accompany them on the HMT Dunera. He was able to return to England in 1941 and rejoin his family.

In 1948, Essinger closed Bunce Court and Meyer went into business with a former student, Peter Ryan. In 1956, the partnership was dissolved and Meyer enrolled at Culham College in Abingdon, Oxfordshire, (formerly in Berkshire) and acquired a teaching certificate, enabling him to work as a teacher. He found employment at Shepway School in Maidstone, Kent, where he worked in a special unit for boys for the next 20 years, retiring in 1978.

Meyer's first wife died in 1977. He and his second wife, Susanne Hein, from Hamburg, were married in 2001.

After a Bunce Court reunion in 2003, Meyer contacted as many former pupils as he could find and invited them to contribute reminiscences of the school, publishing them privately as a book called Reflections: Bunce Court.
