= Hanna Bergas =

German teacher (1900–1987)

- Born: March 11, 1900
- Died: January 1987 (aged 87-88)
- Occupation: Teacher

Hanna Bergas (March 11, 1900 – January 1987) was a German teacher. Fired from her job and prevented from teaching in public schools in Nazi Germany, she found employment at a private boarding school in Blaustein, in southern Germany. In 1939, after she had fled to England, Bergas was part of the group of teachers from Bunce Court School that met the Kindertransports and helped the refugee children adjust to their lives in the new country. After the war, Bergas emigrated a second time, moving to the United States.

== Career ==
Bergas was fired from her job in early April 1933 as the Third Reich began restricting employment for Jews. Bergas arrived at school shortly before 8:00 a.m. and was greeted by the principal, who asked her to step into his office, whereupon he told her he'd been given orders to prevent her from going to her classroom and that she was no longer allowed to teach at German schools. There was no one to say goodbye to because her colleagues were all in their classrooms, so she gathered her belongings and went home. That afternoon, people came by to express their sorrow and anger at their country. Colleagues and pupils with their mothers brought flowers of all sorts and sizes. By evening, the flowers and fragrance had created the ambience of a funeral. Bergas wrote: "and indeed, this was the funeral of my time teaching at a German public school".

Bergas was then hired by Anna Essinger to teach history at her private boarding school, Landschulheim Herrlingen. Within months, Essinger decided that Nazi Germany was no longer conducive to educating children and she moved the entire school to Kent, England. Bergas and her cousin Helmut Schneider, who had also become a teacher there, moved with the school.

In 1938, Essinger was asked to organize a reception camp at Dovercourt for the Kindertransports coming from Germany with thousands of children unaccompanied by their parents. From December 1938 to January 1939, Bergas was part of the group of four staff from Bunce Court—three teachers and a cook—who went to meet the Kindertransports and help the children adjust to their new situation. Bergas described the scene at the arrival of the first transport with hundreds of confused children who neither knew each other nor anyone else, who were "full of anxiety and distrust" because of bad treatment received under growing antisemitism:

The main thing was to instill in them calm and confidence that the people would be kind to them. A good first meal served soon after arrival did its share. Then we settled them in their sleeping quarters; they were given their suitcases and bundles, which they had brought with them, a thing of great importance to them, for many of the children were used to having everything taken away from them. —Hanna Bergas's memoir

After Bunce Court School closed in 1948, Bergas emigrated to the United States, settling in Palo Alto, California. She wrote a memoir about her experience teaching in England at Bunce Court. Called Fifteen Years: Lived among, with and for refugee children, 1933-1948, it is archived at the Leo Baeck Institute in New York.
