= Fridolin Friedmann =

Fridolin Moritz Max Friedmann (June 2, 1897 – October 15, 1976) was a progressive German-Jewish educator. He taught at the Odenwald School and was later headmaster at the Landschulheim Caputh, both in Germany. He accompanied several Kindertransports to England, remaining there himself in 1939. He began teaching at Bunce Court School in 1946, hired by Anna Essinger to replace her, but she decided to close the school in 1948. He then taught at several other places before retiring. In retirement, he gave lectures about Jewish history.

== Biographical details ==
Friedmann was born in Burgkunstadt, Bavaria. He attended the Ludwig-Maximilians-Universität München, Heidelberg University, the University of Cologne, and the University of Erlangen, receiving his doctorate in philosophy in 1925 with a dissertation on Moses Mendelssohn. He was a strong believer in the importance of the arts, particularly music, in the education of children.

In 1925, Friedmann began teaching at the Odenwald School, a private boarding school in Heppenheim, Germany. In 1926, he began teaching at Samson School, a Jewish school in Wolfenbüttel. In July 1928, he passed his science exam in Cologne and in October 1929, he passed his teaching exam in Berlin. For a time, he conducted scholarly research in Königs Wusterhausen and in 1932, he was hired to be the director of Landschulheim Caputh. He was granted his teaching certificate from the Potsdam school administration on May 2, 1932, less than a year before the Nazi Party seized power and shortly thereafter, began to prohibit Jewish educators from teaching at "German" schools, requiring that they work at strictly Jewish schools. In 1937, while continuing to teach in Caputh on the weekend, Friedmann began working at a private secondary school (realgymnasium) in Berlin which had been set up by the Berlin Jewish community. Following Kristallnacht, in November 1938, England agreed to accept 10,000 refugee children and a series of Kindertransports were set up. Friedmann accompanied several of them, remaining himself in 1939.

After the war, Friedman was in charge of reception centers for children survivors of the Holocaust. In 1946, he was hired by Anna Essinger to teach and become the new headmaster at Bunce Court School, a German-Jewish school that had been a community of refugee children and adults during the Nazi era and World War II. After the war, it took in a number of children survivors of Nazi concentration camps. The relationship with Essinger, who had been the sole headmistress of the school since its inception in Germany in 1926, was difficult and Friedmann left. Bunce Court School closed in 1948.

Friedmann taught at Carmel College, both at its first location in Greenham, then in Wallingford. He retired in 1961. He continued to lecture on Jewish history, speaking at Leo Baeck College and City Lit.
