= Minna von Barnhelm =

Play by Gotthold Ephraim Lessing

Minna von Barnhelm or the Soldiers' Happiness (German: Minna von Barnhelm oder das Soldatenglück, pronounced [ˈmɪnaː fɔn ˈbaʁnhɛlm ˈʔoːdɐ das zɔlˈdaːtn̩ˌɡlʏk]) is a lustspiel or comedy by the German author Gotthold Ephraim Lessing. It has five acts, was begun in 1763 and completed in 1767 – its author put the year 1763 on the official title page, presumably to emphasize that the recent Seven Years' War plays a major part in the play, which is set on 22 August 1763. It is one of the most important comedies in German literature. It was first performed in 1767 by the Hamburg National Theatre, where Lessing worked as a dramaturg.

== Plot ==
Wounded and dishonourably discharged from the Prussian Army and threatened by financial troubles and serious bribery allegations, Major von Tellheim waits at a Berlin hotel, with his servant, Just, for the outcome of his trial. His penniless condition is because repayment of a large sum advanced to the government during the recent war is being held up and his honor in making the loan questioned. During Tellheim's absence from the inn, the landlord has caused Tellheim's effects to be removed, ostensibly because his rooms were needed for a lady and her maid. In reality, the landlord doubts Tellheim's ability to pay, since he is already in arrears.

In the removal of the Major's possessions, the landlord comes upon a sealed envelope marked as containing five hundred thalers. This discovery makes him anxious to placate Tellheim. What he does not know is that the money has been left with the Major by Paul Werner, his former sergeant. Werner, knowing Tellheim's predicament, is in hope that he will use the money as his own. Tellheim is too honorable to borrow when he has no assurance of repaying. Instead, he bids his servant to take his last possession of value, an expensive ring, and pawn it to satisfy the landlord's bill and his own back wages.

Just pledges the ring with the landlord but refuses to accept either wages or dismissal on the plea that he is in Tellheim's debt and will have to work it out. The garrulous landlord shows the ring to some newly-arrived guests, revealing considerable information concerning the owner's circumstances. The lady, Minna von Barnhelm, recognizes the ring as one of the betrothal rings which she and Tellheim had exchanged, and is overjoyed that her search for her missing lover is ended.

When Tellheim appears, however, he refuses to accept her hand or to continue the engagement on account of his precarious circumstances. When no argument can move him, Minna, with the help of her maid, Franziska, pretends that she, too, is penniless and in dire straits. Under these circumstances Tellheim immediately claims the privilege of marrying and protecting her.

At this point a delayed letter from the King is delivered. It announces the restoration of Tellheim's fortune and the vindication of his honor. To punish him for making her suffer, Minna now pretends that she cannot marry Tellheim because of the inequality of their circumstances. In answer to his pleas, she uses his own recent arguments to confound him. Only when Tellheim is reduced to the verge of despair and the belated arrival of Minna's uncle and guardian threatens to give the whole thing away does Minna relent and reveal the truth. In a final scene of celebration, matters are settled to the satisfaction of everyone, including Franziska and Paul Werner who have discovered a lively interest in each other.

== Performance history ==
The play had its world premiere at 30 September 1767 at the Hamburg National Theatre, which Lessing had just joined as a dramaturg. In Prussia it was then briefly banned from performance in a dispute with the Berlin censors. It then won huge stage success and was performed in all the main theatres in the German-speaking countries and then abroad. Goethe celebrated Minna to Eckermann in retrospect as "a shining Meteor. It made us aware something else existed, higher than the concept of that literary era." Later productions were particularly influenced by Goethe's comment that "One work, however, is the truest product of the Seven Years' War, a perfect north-German national product, one which I must honourably mention above all, the first theatrical production of real-life, set in a specific time, which had a more calculated effect than anything that came before: Minna von Barnhelm." Lessing modeled the character of the sergeant on the famous lieutenant general of the Prussian army, Paul von Werner, commander of the Brown hussars ( Hussar Regiment No 6): the character's name was even Paul von Werner. The play was a characteristic example of the Soldatenstücke (soldier plays) popular in the latter half of the 18th century. In one amateur production a young Johann Wolfgang von Goethe played the part of Werner. In 1786 an English version The Disbanded Officer by James Johnstone appeared at the Theatre Royal, Haymarket in London.

To date it is one of the most-performed plays in Germany. Scenes from it were performed at Bunce Court School, an exiled German Jewish refugee school in England. It was performed by refugee children under the direction of Wilhelm Marckwald, also a refugee and a former director at the Deutsches Theater in Berlin.

A production also premiered on 16 December 2005 at the Wiener Burgtheater, with the lead roles taken by Sven-Eric Bechtolf and Sabine Haupt – its key point was that money was in lieu of honour. Another was put on at the Deutsches Theater in Berlin in January 2005, with Martina Gedeck as Minna, Ulrich Matthes as Tellheim and Nina Hoss as Franziska.

== Adaptations ==
=== Musical ===
An adaptation as a musical (with book and lyrics by Michael Wildenhain, the idea and concept by Klaus Wagner, and the music by Konstantin Wecker and Nicolas Kemmer) premiered on 2 December 2000 at the Theater Heilbronn, with 22 performances in a run until 7 April 2001.

=== Film ===
- 1940, as The Girl from Barnhelm (Director: Hans Schweikart; with Käthe Gold and Ewald Balser), Germany
- 1942 – The Barnhelm scenes, as part of the theatre-film "Fronttheater", the film ending with Heli Finkenzeller and René Deltgen acting the reconciliation at a performance in Athens
- 1957: Minna von Barnhelm of soldatengeluk (Director: Max Douwes), Netherlands
- 1960: Heldinnen (Director: Dietrich Haugk; with Marianne Koch, Paul Hubschmid, Johanna von Koczian), BRD
- 1962: Minna von Barnhelm oder Das Soldatenglück (Director: Martin Hellberg), DDR
- 1976: Minna von Barnhelm (Director: Franz Peter Wirth; with Reinhild Solf, Frank Hoffmann), BRD
