= Marckwald =

Marckwald is a surname. Notable people with the surname include:

- Dorothy Marckwald (1898–1986), American interior designer
- Wilhelm Marckwald (fl. 1930s–1940s), German actor and director
- Willy Marckwald (1864–1942), German chemist
