= Val May =

English theatre director (1927–2012)

- Born: Valentine Gilbert Delabere May; 1 July 1927; Bath, Somerset
- Died: 6 April 2012 (aged 84); Guildford
- Occupation: Theatre director

Valentine Gilbert Delabere "Val" May, CBE (1 July 1927 – 6 April 2012) was an English theatre director and artistic director. He led the Bristol Old Vic from 1961 to 1975, and the Yvonne Arnaud Theatre from 1975 to 1992.

== Early life and education ==
Val May was born in Bath, Somerset. His father, Claude Jocelyn Delabere May, was a doctor, and his mother, whose maiden name was Olive Gilbert, was a descendant of W.S. Gilbert. Through his paternal grandmother, he was third cousin to Richard Body MP. The family moved to Guildford while May was a child. He attended Cranleigh School and Peterhouse, Cambridge before studying at the London Old Vic Theatre School under Michel Saint-Denis. His national service was in the Royal Navy.

== Early career ==
Val May's first professional engagement was in 1950, when he directed Jean Cocteau's The Typewriter at the Watergate Theatre in London. He spent three years at the Dundee Repertory Theatre as assistant to the artistic director and became artistic director of the Ipswich Theatre in 1953. From 1957 to 1961, he was artistic director of the Nottingham Playhouse. May directed the London Old Vic's production of Richard II in 1959. Also in 1959, the Nottingham company's production of Keith Waterhouse and Willis Hall's comedy Celebration was transferred to London's Duchess Theatre.

== Bristol Old Vic ==
May was artistic director of the Bristol Old Vic from 1961 to 1975. Many of his productions transferred to West End theatres, and some to Broadway. An early success was Erwin Piscator's adaptation of War and Peace, translated by Robert David MacDonald, which had its British premiere in Bristol in February 1962 and was performed at the London Old Vic that summer. In 1963, May directed J.B. Priestly's adaptation of Iris Murdoch's novel A Severed Head. It premiered in Bristol before moving to London's Criterion Theatre the same year and then to Broadway in 1966. May also directed the world premiere production of Frank Marcus's lesbian-themed comedy The Killing of Sister George at the Bristol Old Vic in 1965. He took the production to the Duke of York's Theatre in London later the same year, and to the Belasco Theatre in New York in October 1966.

During his tenure, the Bristol Old Vic company doubled in size and undertook a number of foreign tours. In the early 1970s, May supervised architect Peter Moro's redesign of the Theatre Royal, the Bristol Old Vic's home. This involved replacing the entrance and adding a 150-seat studio space. May also had the Theatre Royal's eighteenth-century raked stage replaced by a flat scenic stage.

== Yvonne Arnaud Theatre ==
From 1975 to 1992, May was artistic director of the Yvonne Arnaud Theatre in his childhood home of Guildford. The theatre's artistic policy had been relatively mainstream and May continued in the same vein, mounting popular productions that could be sold on to West End theatres. This allowed the Yvonne Arnaud to withstand a chronic funding problem, and in 1985 total withdrawal of Arts Council funding. During the 1980s, twenty-seven productions were transferred to West End theatres.

== Freelance director and later career ==
In the 1980s and 1990s, May was active as a director in London and elsewhere. His productions included Neil Simon's Little Me at the Prince of Wales Theatre in 1984 and Royce Ryton's The Royal Baccarat Scandal at the 1988 Chichester Festival. In 1984 he directed Peter O'Toole in Pygmalion at the Shaftesbury Theatre. The production moved to the Plymouth Theatre in New York in 1987. He was especially known for his success with costume dramas, including touring productions of plays by Oscar Wilde. From 1993 to 1996, May directed the Ludlow Festival, which presented The Taming of the Shrew, Richard III and King Lear during his tenure. His last London production was Jeffrey Archer's The Accused in 2000.

Val May was married twice and had a daughter by each marriage. The elder is the television director, Juliet May. He was made a Commander of the Order of the British Empire in 1989. He died near Guildford in 2012.
