= Dovercourt =

Town in Essex, England

Coordinates: 51.9308°N 1.2637°E

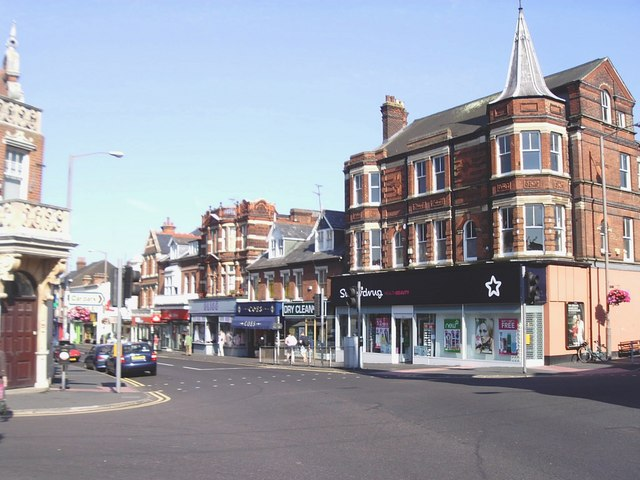
- Town centre

- Location within Essex
- OS grid reference: TM244308
- Civil parish: Harwich
- District: Tendring
- Shire county: Essex
- Region: East
- Country: England
- Sovereign state: United Kingdom
- Post town: HARWICH
- Postcode district: CO12
- Dialling code: 01255
- Police: Essex
- Fire: Essex
- Ambulance: East of England
- UK Parliament: Harwich and North Essex

Dovercourt is a town and an area of Harwich in the Tendring district of Essex, England. Dovercourt has been administered as part of Harwich since at least the 17th century and forms part of the Harwich built up area. It is sometimes described as a suburb of Harwich and sometimes as a separate town. The area around Dovercourt High Street now serves as the main town centre of the Harwich built up area; there are few retail facilities in the old town of Harwich. Dovercourt is also a seaside resort, with beaches onto Dovercourt Bay on its southern side. It is served by Dovercourt railway station.

== History ==
The name is common Brittonic with "Dover" coming from "dwfr", which is "water" in modern Welsh; the origin of "court" is unknown but possibly meant "land cut off by". Dovercourt was recorded as 'Douorcortae' in the year 1000.

Dovercourt appears in the Domesday Book of 1086, when it was a manor. The Domesday Book records that a Saxon lord called Wulwin or Ulwin had been lord of the manor in 1066; by 1086 the estate was in possession of Aubrey de Vere and remained part of the barony of his descendants, the Earls of Oxford, until the 16th century. It formed part of the dowry of Juliana de Vere when she married Hugh Bigod in the mid-12th century, and the sub-tenancy passed to the Bigod earls of Norfolk who held it as one knight's fee of the Veres. Countess Juliana's son Roger Bigod, 2nd Earl of Norfolk founded a chapel at Harwich and granted it to Colne Priory, Essex, a Vere foundation.

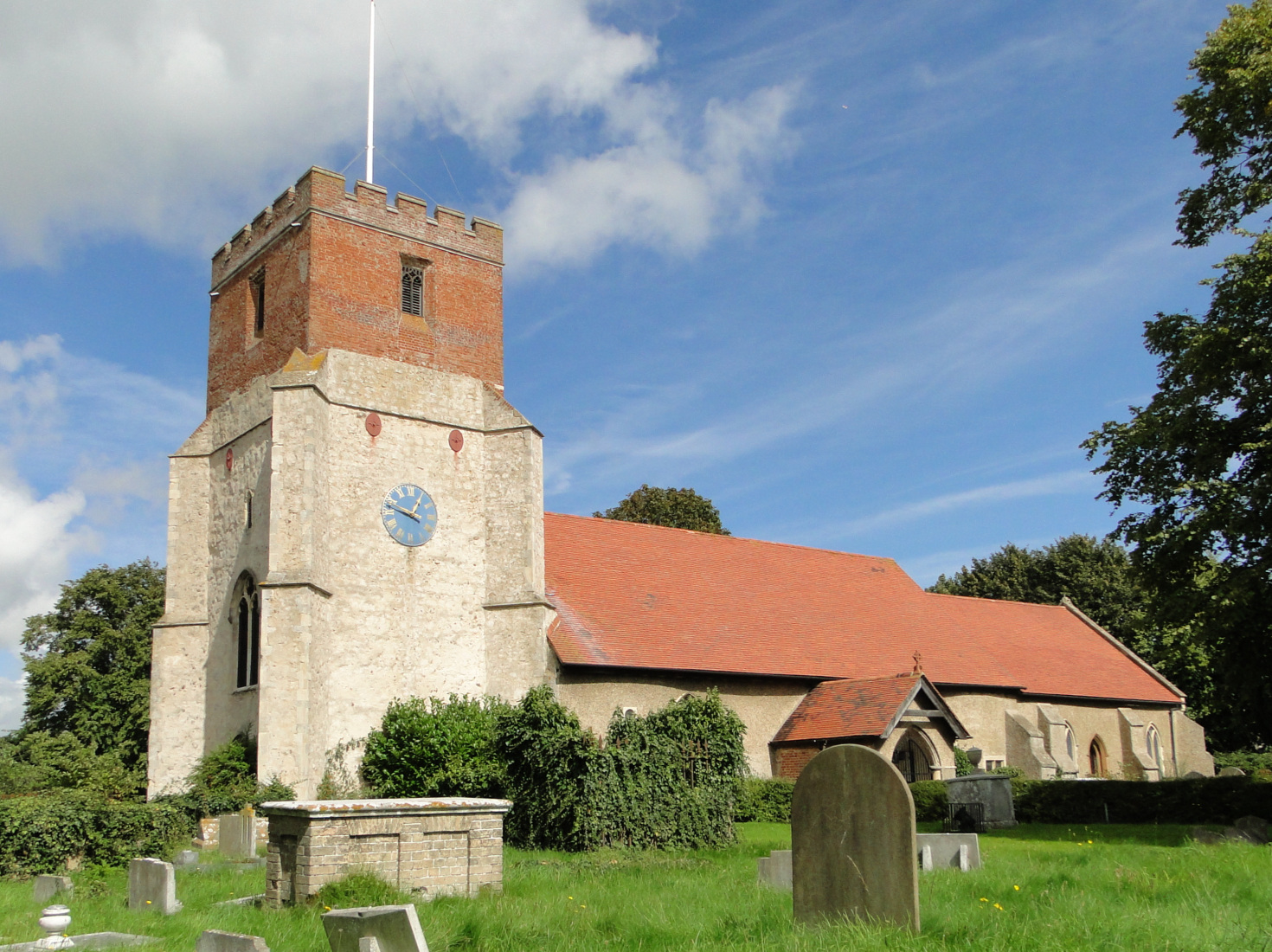
All Saints' Church

The original village of Dovercourt, later known as Upper Dovercourt, stands a little way inland around the parish church, dedicated to All Saints; the current building dates back to the 12th century.

Harwich grew up from the 12th century within the parish of Dovercourt, standing on a peninsula at its eastern end. Harwich had a chapel of ease by 1177 but remained a small settlement until the mid-13th century. Harwich was given the right to hold a market in 1253 and the town developed significantly after that as a market town and port, and was granted its first borough charter in 1318. Harwich was deemed to be a separate parish from Dovercourt for civil purposes by the 16th century, but remained part of the ecclesiastical parish of Dovercourt until 1871, when its chapel of St Nicholas was upgraded to being a parish church.

Harwich is known to have been granted several borough charters in medieval times, but the earliest surviving charter was issued in 1604. This charter confirms that the borough covered the whole area of the two parishes of Harwich St Nicholas and Dovercourt; it is not clear whether Dovercourt was added to the borough by virtue of that charter or whether Dovercourt was already included in the borough under the earlier lost charters.

In 1845 a property developer called John Bagshaw bought land in the area then known as Lower Dovercourt, immediately west of Harwich and to the east of Upper Dovercourt. He developed plans to develop a new resort overlooking the sea with the help of W.H. Lindsey, a London architect. He started the project in 1845 by building a mansion, Cliff House, for himself and his family and actively promoted the railway link to the Harwich area; Dovercourt railway station opened with the line to Harwich in 1854. When a chalybeate spring was discovered in the grounds of Cliff House, Bagshaw extended the property to incorporate a spa, library, pump room, and conservatory. He next developed Orwell Terrace where his son Robert John Bagshaw, like his father an MP for Harwich, moved into Banksea House in 1857. However the development project, which included Marine Parade and the Cliff Estate, caused Bagshaw financial difficulties and he was declared bankrupt in 1859. Although Cliffe House was demolished in 1909 and the Spa in 1920, most of his other developments still stand.

From at least 1604, the borough of Harwich had covered the two parishes of Dovercourt and Harwich St Nicholas. In 1925 the two civil parishes were merged into a single parish of Harwich matching the borough. At the 1921 census (the last before the abolition of the civil parish), Dovercourt had a population of 7,695.

Both Upper Dovercourt and Lower Dovercourt were being described as suburbs of Harwich by the early 20th century. Lower Dovercourt came to be known as Dovercourt and it now has the main town centre for the Harwich built up area; there are today few retail facilities in the old town of Harwich.

In 1939 Warner's Holiday Camp, in Low Road, was used for refugee children arriving in the UK in the Kindertransport mission. This was carried out under the direction of Anna Essinger and aided by several of the staff from Bunce Court School, In the 1980s Warner's was used as the set for the filming of BBC sitcom Hi-de-Hi!. The site, with the original 1930s chalets, was transformed into Maplin’s. It is now a housing estate known as Hightrees.

=== The Dovercourt shrine ===
In the 1400s All Saints Church in Main Road drew thousands of pilgrims after the wooden cross (or rood) on its rood screen became a shrine. "It acquired a miraculous reputation and was said to have spoken on some occasions" said the historian John Ashdown-Hill. The 1600 version of the play Grim, the Collier of Croydon says: "And now the rood of Dovercourt did speak, Confirming his opinions to true."

The accounts of John Howard, 1st Duke of Norfolk, show that he donated money to the shrine "including clothing in 1482 used to dress the image of Christ on the rood", according to Ashdown-Hill.

The 1981 edition of Brewer's Dictionary of Phrase & Fable says that John Foxe reported that the crowd in the church was so great "no man could shut the door". It adds that the word "Dovercourt" can mean "a confused gabble, a babel [sic]".

In 1532 four young Protestants from Dedham, Essex and East Bergholt rode to Dovercourt. According to Foxe, they were intrigued by the rood's miraculous reputation and wanted to see whether it could defend itself. They took down the rood and burnt it. Three of the men were caught and hanged. The site of the burning is commemorated by the road name Holyrood on a nearby 1960s housing estate.

=== Dovercourt women ===
Brewer's Dictionary of Phrase & Fable notes that the females of Dovercourt had a reputation for being "scolds and chattering women". This is possibly connected with the Dovercourt shrine, above. The book cites Lines in the Belfry of St Peter's, Shaftesbury, as saying: "When bells ring round and their order be, They do denote how neighbours should agree; But when they claim, the harsh sound spoils the sport, And 'tis like women keeping Dovercourt."

=== Lighthouses ===
In 1863 Trinity House erected a pair of cast iron screw-pile lighthouses on the beach, used until 1917 to guide ships around Landguard Point. They served as leading lights and functioned in conjunction with a third lighthouse (a sector light established in 1861) on Landguard Point itself: from seaward the two Dovercourt lights aligned indicated the initial course of approach; vessels would keep to this course until the colour of the Landguard light was seen to change from red to white, whereupon the vessel would take a northerly course into Harwich Haven. When first built the Dovercourt lights used oil lamps and reflectors, and both displayed a fixed (i.e. steady) light. In 1878 the High Light was improved with the installation of a prismatic lens assembly, and in the early 1900s it was given a flashing characteristic following the introduction of gas, in place of oil, as the illuminant for both lights.

In 1917 Harwich Harbour Board took over responsibility for navigation marks in the vicinity and chose to mark the deep-water channel with a series of lighted buoys, rendering the lighthouses redundant. The lights were discontinued, but the structures left in situ. In 1975 both lighthouses were designated as a scheduled monument, together with the stone causeway which runs between them. They were restored in the 1980s; however, following a detailed survey they were placed on Historic England's Heritage at Risk Register in 2019.

== Media ==
Local TV coverage is provided by BBC Look East and ITV News Anglia. The town is served by both BBC Essex and BBC Radio Suffolk. Other radio stations including Heart East, Greatest Hits Radio Essex, Actual Radio, and Nation Radio Suffolk. The town is served by the local newspaper, Harwich and Manningtree Standard which publishes on Fridays.

== Gallery ==
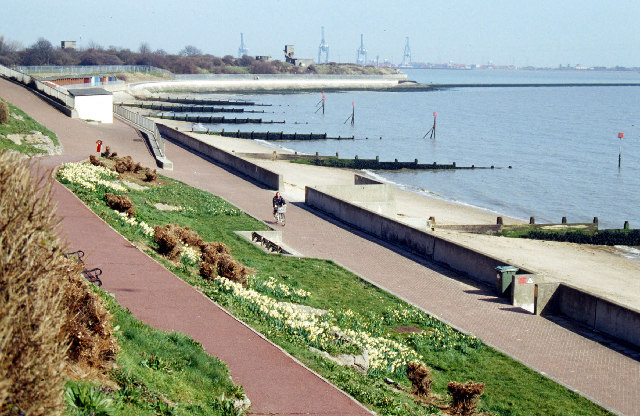
Seafront

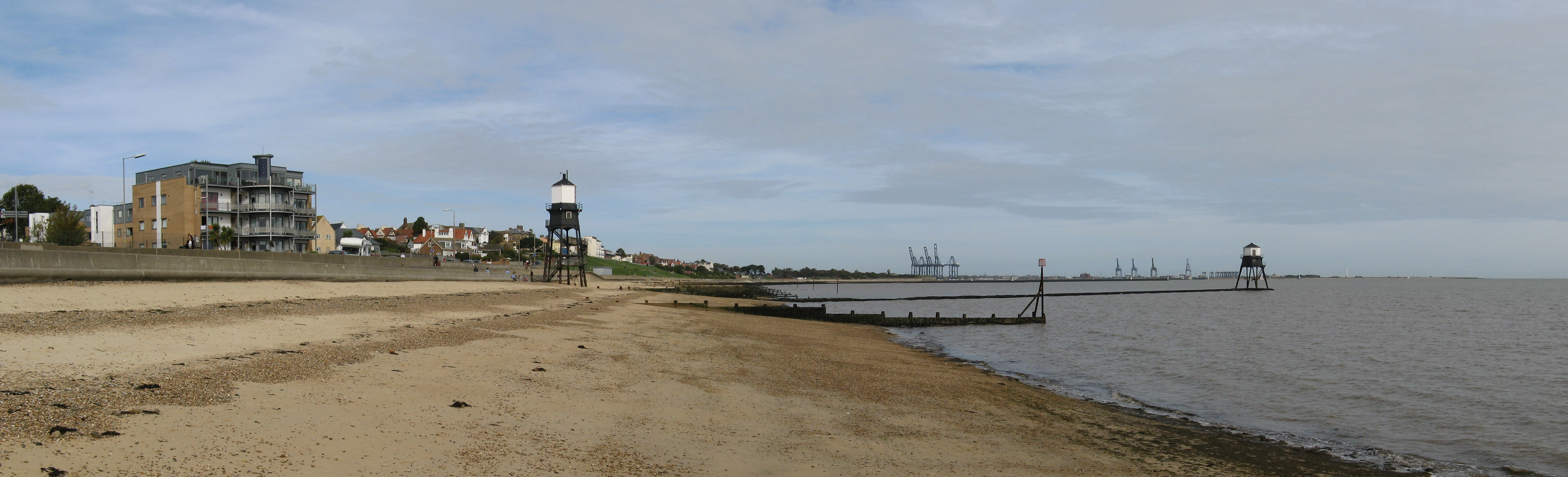
Dovercourt beach and lighthouses

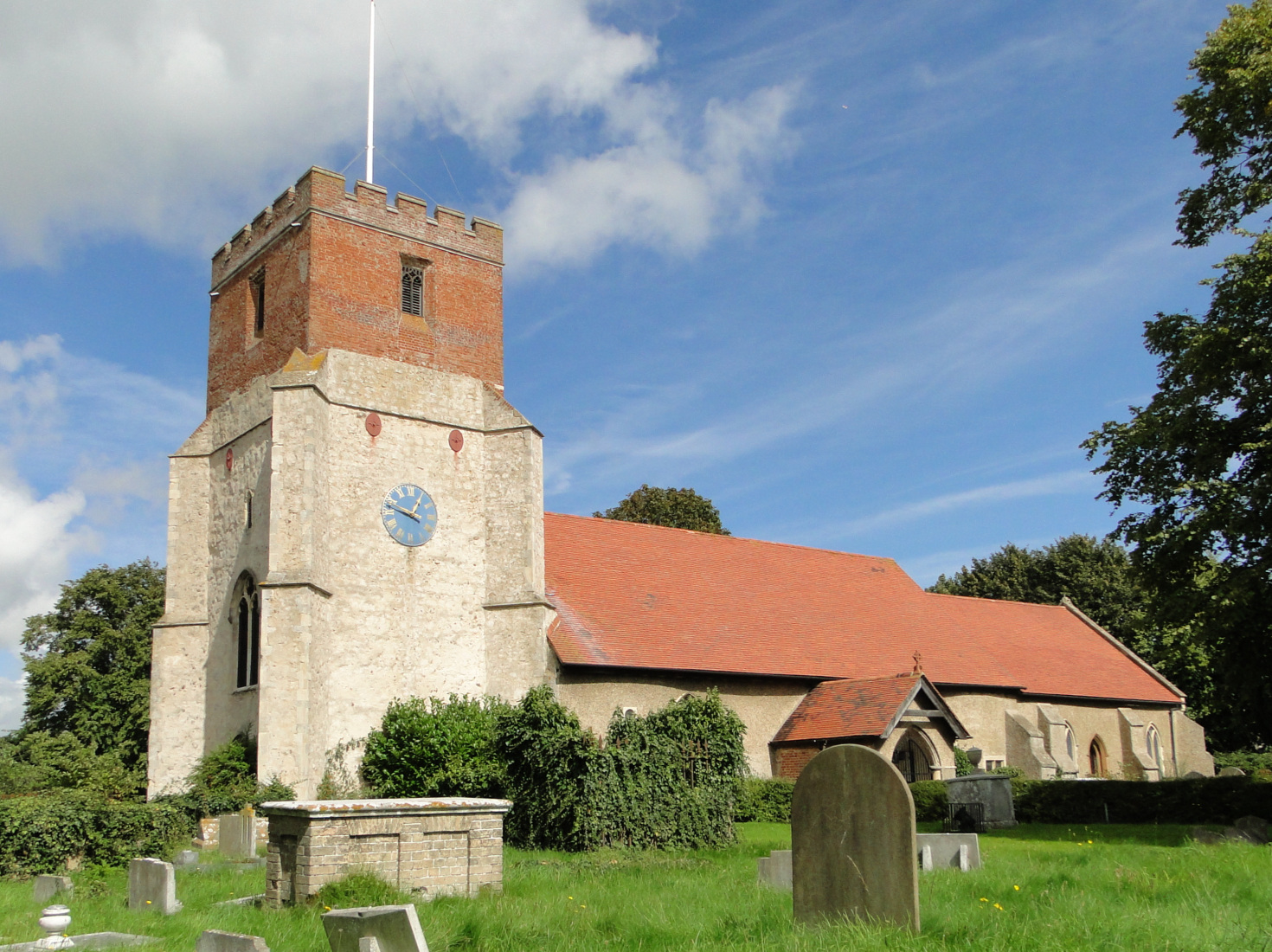
All Saints' Church, Dovercourt

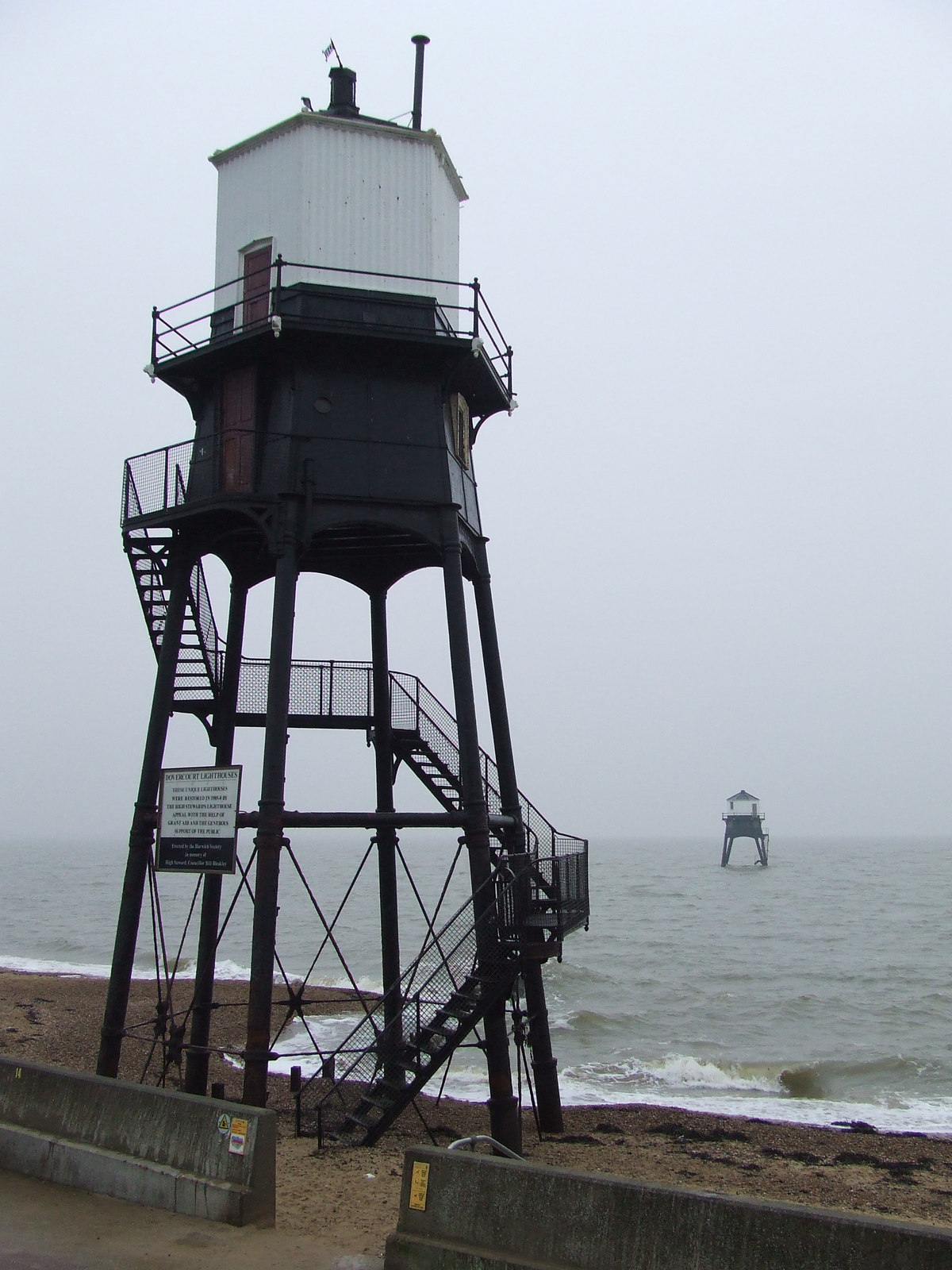
Dovercourt High and Low Lights

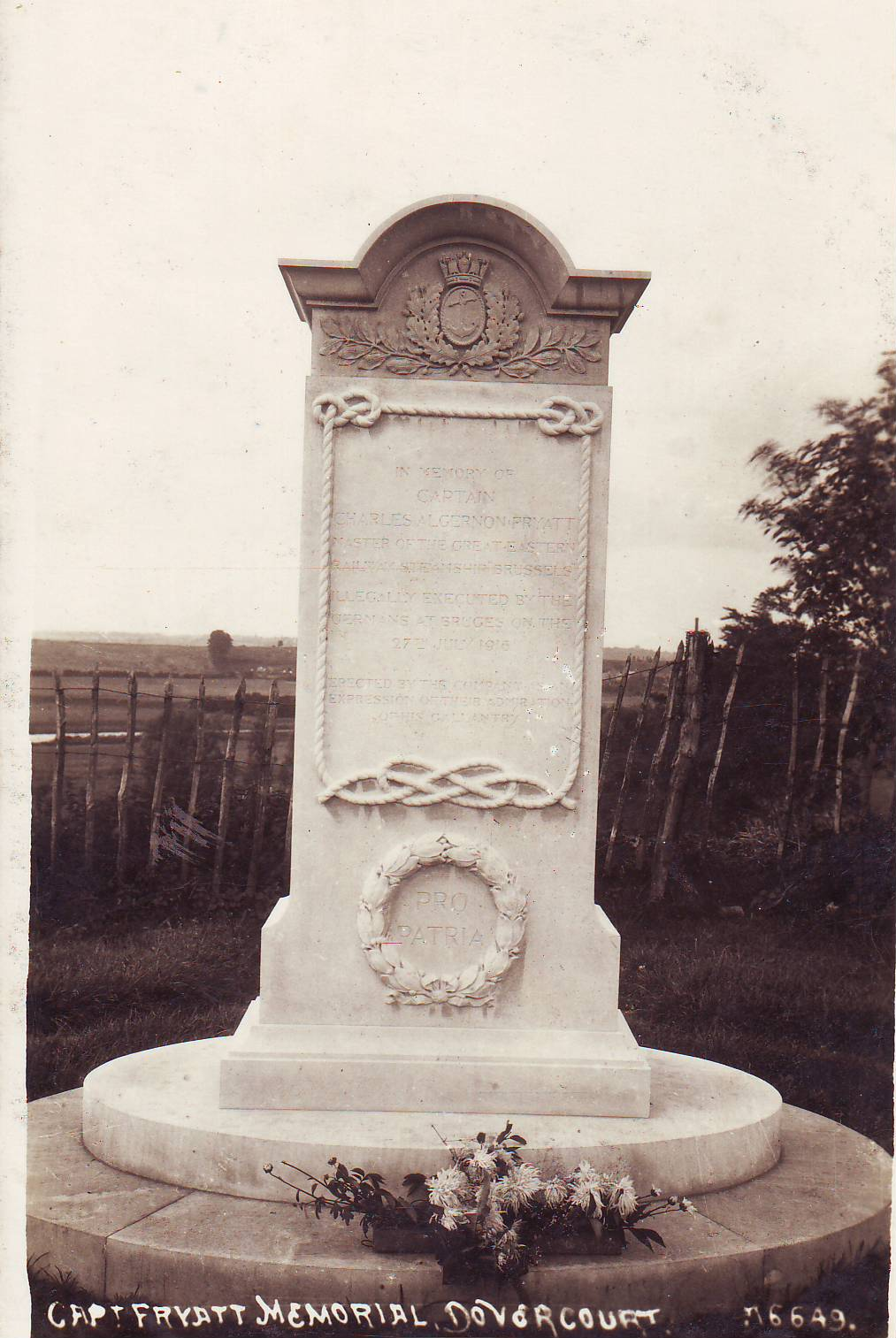
Memorial to Captain Charles Fryatt, shot by the Germans in 1916

== Notable people ==
- John Bagshaw - developer of Dovercourt. MP for Harwich.
- Robert John Bagshaw - son of the above. MP for Harwich
- Hanna Bergas - teacher of Kindertransport children
- Charles Fryatt - GER captain, captured and shot in 1916
- Roy Salvadori - winner of 1959 Le Mans 24 hours and Formula One driver
- Constance Lindsay Taylor - author, playwright and screenwriter
