= Bunce Court School =

New Herrlingen School at Bunce Court
- Main building at Bunce Court

Location
- Otterden, Kent; England; 51°14′47.15″N 0°46′37.44″E

Information
- School type: private boarding school
- Religious affiliations: Jewish, Quaker
- Opened: 1 May 1926
- Founders: Anna Essinger, Paula Essinger, Klara Weimersheimer
- Closed: 27 July 1948
- Headmistress: Anna Essinger
- Teaching staff: Bruno Adler, Hanna Bergas, Erich Katz, Wilhelm Marckwald, Hans Meyer, Adolf Prag
- Gender: co-educational
- Enrollment: 64–140 pupils
- Average class size: 5–8 pupils
- Education system: progressive education
- Language: English
- Campus: Bunce Court
- School fees: £100 per year
- Communities served: Jewish refugees from Nazism
- Alumni: Frank Auerbach, Leslie Brent, Gerard Hoffnung, Frank Marcus, Peter Morley, Michael Roemer, Helmut and Richard Sonnenfeldt

The Bunce Court School was an independent, private boarding school in the village of Otterden, in Kent, England. It was founded in 1933 by Anna Essinger, who had previously founded a boarding school, Landschulheim Herrlingen in the south of Germany, but after the Nazi Party seized power in 1933, she began to see that the school had no future in Germany. She quietly found a new home for the school and received permission from the parents of her pupils, most of whom were Jewish, to bring them to safety in England. The new school was called New Herrlingen School, but came to be known as Bunce Court. The school closed in 1948. Alumni, who sometimes stayed on at the school even after finishing, were devoted to the school and organized reunions for 55 years. They have referred to its "immense effect" on their lives, as "Shangri-La" and to being there as "walking on holy ground".

== Landschulheim Herrlingen ==
The school was founded by Anna Essinger and two of her sisters in the Swabian town of Herrlingen in 1926. It began as an adjunct to the children's home founded by Essinger's sister Klara in 1912. In 1925, as her own children and many of the children in care came of school age, she got the idea to turn the orphanage into a landschulheim (boarding school). Landschulheim Herrlingen opened on 1 May 1926 as a private boarding school with 18 children ranging in age from 6 to 12. Anna Essinger became head of the school and her sister Paula, a trained nurse, became the school nurse and its housekeeper. The ceremonies to open the school were attended by Theodor Heuss and Otto Hirsch from Stuttgart, as well as the mayors of Göppingen and Ulm.

Landschulheim Herrlingen was non-denominational, accepting children from any faith, and coeducational. Having been influenced by progressive education in the United States, Essinger ran the school accordingly. The primary grades were taught using the Montessori method. Teachers were to set an example in "learning, laughing, loving and living" and the motto for the school was "Boys and girls learn to be inquisitive, curious and independent and to find things out themselves. All work is to encourage critical thinking." Individual work was encouraged. There was no testing of skills or attainment. Instead, grading was replaced by an assessment that described the development of the individual child and progress was discussed with the children. Parents received the assessment of their children in writing.

Academics were supplemented with a strong emphasis on the arts, as well as physical activity, including daily walks in the woods. The children learned two languages from the first day of school on, with emphasis on the spoken, rather than the written word. Learning was accomplished through living, whether from daily walks in the woods, from the tasks required of the children in and around the building, or at meal time, where there were "English" and "French" tables and those sitting at them would speak in those languages during the meal. The arts were also offered. In addition to painting, drawing, singing and drama, the children learned to play music. In the evening, "Tante Anna" read a story, then gave each child a "good night kiss" and sent them off to bed.

Staff and pupils were on a first-name basis; Anna Essinger was generally called Tante (Aunt) Anna, or TA for short. She was a strict disciplinarian with both staff and pupils, but the environment at the school was loving and supportive. Corporal punishment was taboo.

The teachers were idealistic and in 1927, the school received very good early assessments. Enrolment soon grew to 60 pupils.

== Escape from Nazi Germany ==
After Adolf Hitler and the Nazi Party seized power in January 1933, and with antisemitism on the rise, the school became increasingly Jewish, as some parents bowed to pressure to boycott Jewish institutions and Jewish parents found it increasingly difficult to find placement for their children. In April 1933, when all public buildings were ordered to fly the Nazi flag and swastika, Essinger planned a day-long outing for her school, leaving the flag to fly over an empty building, a symbolic gesture, according to a nephew. Afterwards, Essinger and the school were denounced and the school came under Nazi scrutiny with a recommendation to install a school inspector at the school. In May 1933, Essinger was informed that her oldest pupils would not be allowed to take the tests for the abitur, the school-leaving certificate needed to pursue a university education, and most non-Jewish parents withdrew their children from the school.

Essinger realized that Germany was no longer a hospitable place for her school and sought to relocate it in a more secure environment abroad. She first sought a new location in Switzerland, then in the Netherlands and finally, in England, where she found an old manor house dating from 1547 in Otterden, near Faversham in Kent. The house is called Bunce Court, after the family that owned the property in the 17th century. Essinger raised funds in England, primarily from Quakers, initially to rent and later, to purchase Bunce Court. She informed the parents of her desire to move the school to England and received permission to take 65 children with her. The children all went home for summer vacation, not knowing they were leaving Landschulheim Herrlingen for the last time.

In summer 1933, Essinger arrived in England with the 13 pupils prohibited from taking the abitur (schooling completion exam). She set them up at Bunce Court, where they had just a few weeks to prepare for a British matriculation exam; nine of them passed. In autumn 1933, three different groups of children and staff set out on an educational trip for the Netherlands, leaving from the south, the north and the east of Germany. Anna Essinger boarded a train with one group; her sister Paula took a group through Switzerland, where they picked up two pupils who had been on vacation with their mother. All three groups arrived on the ferry in Dover and were picked up in red buses and brought to Kent, where classes began the next day. In addition, there were three children from a Berlin family fleeing Germany that had pre-arranged for their children to meet the ferry and continue on to the school.

Landschulheim Herrlingen was not officially closed, but was instead was turned over to Hugo Rosenthal (1887–1980). Although it was seized by the Nazis in 1934, it continued as a Jewish school and became a centre for Jewish life in southern Germany until 1939, when the Nazis closed it and turned it into a home for Jewish seniors, whom they forced to relocate there from various places in Württemberg. In 1942, the home was closed and its residents sent to extermination camps. Between 1943 and 1945, two of the buildings were occupied by Erwin Rommel and his family. When Rommel was forced to commit suicide, he left from this home.

== New Herrlingen School ==
The new school was called New Herrlingen, but generally known as Bunce Court. It had over 40 rooms and extensive grounds, making it an ideal location for a boarding school. From the beginning, the new school suffered from a chronic lack of funds. There was no money for a domestic or caretaking staff, so everyone, staff and pupils had daily chores and did the work, from converting stables into new dormitories, laying telephone cables and repairing furniture to gardening, growing vegetables and looking after the chickens to peeling potatoes, cleaning and polishing. The younger boys lived in a building, initially without electricity, about 400 metres (0.25 mi) away from the main building. Twenty of the oldest boys lived in a dormitory built on the grounds with the help of British Quakers. The school maintained a large vegetable garden, two greenhouses, five hundred hens, beehives and several pigs, which were fed on kitchen waste, all primarily run by pupils.

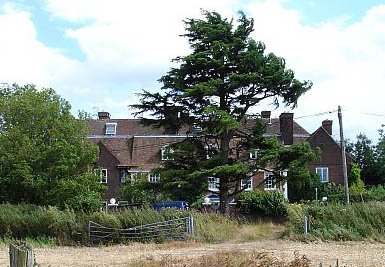
Bunce Court today

In later years, during the Blitz on London, children were evacuated to the countryside for their safety, but in 1933, when Bunce Court opened, England was safe and war was years away. English people were unaware of what was taking place in Germany and did not understand why Essinger and the school had left Germany. The new school was makeshift and finances meagre, causing the English education inspectors to be initially unfavourable toward New Herrlingen. Within a year or two, however, enough improvements had been made that they came to realize the school was viable and unique. In October 1937, there were 68 pupils enrolled at Bunce Court, 41 were boys and 27 were girls. Of the 68, all but three were boarders and all but 12 were foreign-born. By this time, the school had won the respect of the authorities. After three days spent visiting Bunce Court in 1937, inspectors from the British government's Ministry of Education reported their amazement "at what could be achieved in teaching with limited facilities" and that they were "convinced it was the personality, enthusiasm and interest of teachers rather than their teaching 'apparatus' that made the school work competently".

New Herrlingen was home, so that even after finishing their education, some pupils would stay on for a number of months, living at the school while working elsewhere, their wages largely going for their upkeep.

=== Finances ===
Fees were set at £100 a year and many, because of their situations, could not pay, or were there on a promise that funds would be forthcoming. The number of pupils was constantly in flux, whether from having finished and passed the Cambridge school examination or because of the chaotic conditions of the era. At times, there were well over 100 pupils, but at other times, well under 100. The school made ends meet by putting everyone—children and staff—to work tending the gardens and animals, and maintaining the buildings and grounds. When a school inspector asked a boy if he'd also done such manual labour back in Germany, he answered, "There, it was an educational method; here, it is a necessity." The children grasped the situation and pitched in.

=== Education ===
Classes were small, from five to eight pupils. The curriculum focused on the English language and literature, history, and maths. German literature was also taught so that the children would understand that "despite all that had happened, human values had not changed and that it was worth nurturing the cultural foundations of the children even though they were separated from their homeland."

There was no money for a laboratory, so the sciences were minimal. (Note: Despite the lack of science classes, an "astonishing number" of Bunce Courtians became doctors and scientists, which alumnus Leslie Brent attributed to "a really solid early education.") Alumnus Thomas Mayer said Bunce Court provided "a highly intellectual atmosphere" with pupils who were excited about what they were learning, where their "intellectual interests were not confined to classroom learning, but encompassed politics, literature and art."

The official language of the school was English. New teachers from England were told not to learn German for at least a year. Essinger also accepted English children to the school, especially non-Jews to foster the non-denominational aspect, and bring in some financial and linguistic support, as well. (Note: Despite Essinger's efforts, the school remained essentially Jewish. For the ten-year period from 1933 to 1943, there were 93 Christian and 432 Jewish pupils.) Nonetheless, most German staff and pupils reverted to German or a combination of German and English, so most English teachers and pupils learned German.

Religion was not stressed at the school, but was just part of the curriculum. Many alumni were, in their adult lives, agnostic or irreligious. Nonetheless, those who wished to observe traditional Friday evening observances and holidays were able to do so with similarly interested staff. Most Bunce Court pupils were from families that had assimilated into the local culture and the children knew little about Jewish culture. Nazi persecution and discrimination made them aware of their Jewishness, so that in England, the school added courses on Jewish history, the teachings of Jewish prophets and the ideas of Jewish philosophers like Maimonides and Spinoza. These courses were taught by Hanna Bergas.

In 1939, war broke out in Europe and on 3 September 1939, war was declared between England and Germany. Defence Regulation 18b was issued, ordering the internment of anyone suspected of sympathizing with the Nazis. The Home Office then ruled that anyone born in Germany was classified as an enemy alien and all German males over age 16 were interned. In addition to the pupils who were interned, some of the pupils who had gone home that summer to visit their families in Nazi areas never returned and were not heard from again. With two hours' notice to pack their things, the school lost five men and 10 of the older boys, (Note: Richard Sonnenfeldt, a pupil interned in May 1940, had learned his father had been put in a Nazi concentration camp 18 months earlier.) then, the cook and female students aged 16, (Note: Gretel Heidt and two girls were interned on 27 May 1940. A third pupil, Ruth Weinberg, was taken the next day, her 16th birthday. She returned to Bunce Court from the Isle of Man on 11 July 1940.) before it was determined that "good Germans" who had fled the Nazis could be released, provided they remain in one place until the end of the war. (Note: Some of the male staff and pupils were sent to Australia, where they were interned in very bad conditions until their release. The boys, being under 18, were released soon after their arrival, but no funds were provided for them to return to England. They eventually made their way to the United States or joined the British army.) This benefited the school greatly. Maths was taught by an astronomer, the music teacher had been an assistant to Ludwig Karl Koch, the stoker, formerly a senior producer at Berlin's Deutsches Theater, directed school plays.

=== Special needs ===
After Kristallnacht, the United Kingdom agreed to accept 10,000 German children in Kindertransports and Bunce Court took in as many of the refugees as possible. As Hitler invaded and annexed other countries, children began to come from Austria, Poland, Czechoslovakia, and Hungary. With an enrolment of uprooted children whose parents were in unknown circumstances, coming from different social classes and cultures, Essinger sometimes found it difficult to find British teachers who were up to the challenges and needs of the pupils. Some children were "almost ill with homesickness and the older children anxious for parents, brothers and sisters left in Germany. A Quaker worker told...of parents' agony of mind who could only choose one of several children to go to England for safe education and which to select—the most brilliant, most fit, or one most vulnerable and unlikely to survive?" Ultimately, many of the pupils never saw their parents again.

Years later, teacher Hans Meyer said, "At the time, it was less important to be a good teacher than it was to be a sympathetic human being. It was more important to give them a good-night kiss than [to teach] excellent German literature." In some cases, there would be letters from parents and then they'd stop coming, particularly once war broke out. (Note: Before the war broke out, letters often would be sent to friends in a neutral country, who would then forward them, but once Hitler had invaded some of those areas, the only mail that came through was censored Red Cross mail that was limited to 25 words, hardly enough to convey any message other than the sender was still alive.) Meyer said, "We tried to lead them away from the period of silence. We didn't know what had happened to the parents. We couldn't give them any hope, neither could we take it from them."

The teachers also had special needs. Upon arriving in England, the overriding concern was to make a good home for the children. At the end of the first year, the teachers had been available to the children without any time off or uninterrupted privacy for themselves. While they were elated that things were going so well, they were exhausted. That changed with the establishment of "off-duty" time to refresh oneself. "It became possible to read, to write a letter, to go away for a few hours or a weekend without being interrupted or missed" wrote Hanna Bergas. She noted that the return to the community was always a joy.

=== Evacuation to Trench Hall ===
In June 1940, the school, with roughly 140 children, was given just three days' notice (extended to a week) to evacuate when the area was determined to be too near the Battle of Britain to tolerate an entire school full of "enemy aliens", who were viewed as potential collaborators.

Essinger found a new location several hours away at Trench Hall, near Wem in Shropshire. After "packing feverishly", the school moved on 14 June 1940, shortly before the senior pupils would have to take their matriculation exams. They all passed. Unlike the original trip to Bunce Court, when the children had shown great interest in the surroundings, this time, tired from the packing, bewildered and restless, they took little interest in the scenery for the first several hours. Then the buses passed through the already bombed city of Coventry, later to be devastated by the Coventry Blitz. The children were shaken, having been previously removed from the reality of war.

It was smaller than Bunce Court, so a group of the youngest children were sent temporarily to a school in Surrey. Even so, there was terrible overcrowding and after a year, the chicken coop and the stables were converted into dormitories, creating enough room to allow the younger children to return. Even so, some bedrooms doubled as classrooms and had to be rearranged for use every morning. More time-consuming, however, was having to cover every window in the evening to comply with the orders for a complete blackout, a task which had to be carried out for years.

In this new location, the local residents occasionally hurled epithets at the pupils, calling them "dirty Jerries". When the 1944 film Henry V was showing at the local cinema, Essinger did not let Bunce Courtians go, in part because she'd been warned that the first newsreel reports from Bergen-Belsen concentration camp would be shown and she didn't want her pupils to realize why they had not heard from their parents, but she was also worried that harm would come to them at the hands of some of the locals.

The school remained at Trench Hall until 1946. The property was much too small for the 140 pupils who moved there, but enrolment dropped after the Nazis banned Jewish emigration in 1941. Also, the school could no longer keep its chickens, pigs or bee hives. While the school was evacuated at Trench Hall, the buildings and grounds of Bunce Court were used by the military and were much changed and required restoration work before the school could return. Not until after the war was over, was the school finally able to return to Bunce Court in 1946.

=== Final years ===
The last children to come to Bunce Court were orphaned Nazi concentration camp survivors who no longer knew what normal life was like. One such boy was Sidney Finkel, born Sevek Finkelstein in Poland, who survived the Piotrków Trybunalski ghetto, deportation to a slave labour camp, separation from his family and imprisonment at Częstochowa, Buchenwald and Theresienstadt concentration camps. He arrived in England in August 1945 at the age of 14 and, along with 10 other Polish boys, was sent to Bunce Court. Traumatized, he and the others were treated with love and care. In his 2006 memoir, Sevek and the Holocaust: The Boy Who Refused to Die, he said his two years at Bunce Court "turned me back into a human being".

After the war, Essinger hired Dr. Fridolin Friedmann to be headmaster of the school, but his tenure was brief, caused by her interference with his work. (Note: Fridolin Friedmann had previously been the rector of a Jewish landschulheim in Caputh and had taught at the Odenwaldschule.) In addition, after the war, a number of the refugee teachers left the school. Already difficult to staff, the situation did not improve after the war; rather, the low salary and remote location made recruitment of new teachers increasingly difficult. In 1948, her eyesight failing badly, unable to manage it herself and, according to some, unable to conceive of anyone else running the school, Essinger closed Bunce Court School.

=== Bunce Court staff ===
Bunce Court started out with a handful of teachers, two secretaries, a gardener, a driver and a cook, who had one (paid) helper. They were mostly German, though there were some British teachers. Staff were given room and board and a monthly stipend of £9, regardless of marital status or position, as the egalitarian atmosphere placed no value on intellectual labour over manual. Alumnus Richard Sonnenfeldt called the teachers "dedicated and superb". Alumnus Werner M. Loval made a list of staff in his book, We Were Europeans: A Personal History of a Turbulent Century. Gretel Heidt was briefly interned as an "enemy alien". In 1940, Hans Meyer was interned at the camp in Huyot and volunteered to be deported to Australia on the Dunera, after learning that some of the Bunce Court boys would be sent there. They were released shortly after arrival; Meyer was returned to England in 1941. Helmut Schneider was also interned and deported.

- Bruno Adler (Note: Bruno Adler's nephew was a pupil. Adler was from the Bauhaus and was an art historian and writer.)
- Hanna Bergas (called Ha-Be, or H.B.), moved with the school from Germany, taught history (Note: Hanna Bergas and Helmut Schneider were cousins.)
- Miss Clifton (Cliffie), an Australian teacher
- Maria Dehn, taught biology and was the head gardener
- Willert Denny
- Anna Essinger (Tante [Aunt] Anna or T.A.), co-founder and headmistress
- Paula Essinger (Tante Paula), head of the kindergarten and school nurse in charge of the "isolation hut" (school clinic)
- Hannah Goldschmidt (Hago), taught geography (Note: Hannah Goldschmidt and Hans Meyer met at the school and got married. Her niece, Ursula Solmitz (later Osborne), was a pupil at Bunce Court.)
- Gretel Heidt (Heidtsche), the cook and a non-Jewish German; all pupils had tasks in the kitchen working under her
- Mr. Horowitz, taught history and English; a British teacher
- Dr. Walter Isaacsohn (Saxo), taught history, Scripture and Jewish subjects, led Friday evening and holiday services
- Frau Berthe Kahn [née Essinger], housemother and in charge of housekeeping
- Lotte Kalischer (Lo-Ka), taught music, violin, piano; gave violin recitals with piano accompaniment by Helmut Schneider
- Erich Katz, taught music from 1941 to 1943
- Pilar Marckwald, Spanish, kitchen helper
- Wilhelm Marckwald, boilerman, gardener, directed plays, played violin
- Hans Meyer (Meyerlein), taught carpentry, sports and gardening, was also a housefather
- Hilde Oppenheimer-Tod (Hutschnur), taught French; was also a housemother (Note: Hilde Oppenheimer-Tod was married to Robert James Niebuhr Tod (13 February 1917–March 1994), author of books on foster care, children in care, social work and a Quaker mystic.)
- Helmut Schneider (Schneiderlein), taught maths, played piano at school concerts (Note: Schneiderlein is the main character in the original German version of Grimms' "The Valiant Little Tailor", Das Tapfere Schneiderlein.)
- Norman Wormleighton (Wormy), taught English, initiated play readings, a British teacher (Note: Prior to working at Bunce Court, Norman Wormleighton taught at Dartington Hall School and was married to Susan Small in early August 1936. A Bunce Court alumnus described him as having been "tall, fair-haired, bearded and kindly". The former English pupil, Oliver Bernard, remembered 70 years later his teacher getting a whole class of 10-year olds to read King Lear. He had older boys memorize several pages of the New Oxford Concise Dictionary every day, in order to improve their English vocabularies.)
- Muriel (Shushi), British teacher (Note: Muriel was nicknamed "Shushi" because she so often shushed the children at bedtime, after "lights out".)

== Legacy ==
Most alumni lost the families they left behind, so especially for them, Bunce Court was not just their school, it was their childhood home and those who lived there, their family. Alumni use reverent terms when speaking about Bunce Court and numerous alumni have written memoirs, all mentioning their time at Bunce Court. Martin Lubowski, who lost his family to Nazi concentration camps, said, "I feel I am walking on holy ground whenever I visit Bunce Court". Richard W. Sonnenfeldt wrote in his book, Witness to Nuremberg, "While I was there, and forever after, Bunce Court has been my Shangri-La." Michael Trede, a German who was not Jewish, said that Bunce Court was, "not a 'normal' school, not an institution, rather more of an emergency association, like an extended family. Frank Auerbach called it a "remarkable school, which was more than a school but a sort of community, a small republic". For many pupils, as well as their teachers, Bunce Court was a last refuge that not only literally saved their lives, but also gave them new meaning and substance." After the school closed, alumni organized reunions for 55 years. Numerous people associated with the school wrote memoirs, both pupils and teachers, as well as Essinger family members and Anna Essinger, whose memoir was not published.

In 1989, author Alan Major wrote a series of articles about the school in Bygone Kent, the County of Kent's local history magazine. Called Bunce Court, Anna Essinger and Her New Herrlingen School, Otterden, it was cited in a 1997 doctoral dissertation, which included a section on Bunce Court. Alumnus Peter Morley's first film was a documentary about Bunce Court and in 1995, Peter Schubert premiered his 1994 film Anna's Children (Annas Kinder), a 57-minute German documentary about Bunce Court and its founder, in Herrlingen.

In July 2007, the original Bunce Court school bell was returned from California, where it had been stored by alumnus Ernst Weinberg. It was reinstalled on top of the former schoolhouse. A plaque honoring both the school and Essinger was unveiled at the same time.

=== Notable alumni ===
Many of the school's alumni went on to distinguished careers in their fields.

- Frank Auerbach, British painter
- Leslie Brent, British immunologist
- Frank George, (son of Manfred George), Fulbright scholar and American architect
- Gerard Hoffnung, British humorist
- Harold Jackson, Guardian journalist
- Werner Loval, Israeli real estate agency founder
- Frank Marcus, British playwright (The Killing of Sister George)
- Thomas Mayer, American economist
- Michael Messer (1927—), Australian biochemist (University of Sydney, Associate Professor)
- Anne-Marie Meyer (1914–2004), historian and essayst, Registrar of the Warburg Institute from 1939 to 1984, sister of Peter Morley, and literary executor of Arnaldo Momigliano.
- Peter Morley, British filmmaker and television producer (Kitty - Return to Auschwitz)
- Michael Roemer, American independent filmmaker, (Nothing But a Man, The Plot Against Harry), Guggenheim Fellow, professor at Yale University
- Helmut Sonnenfeldt, American foreign policy advisor
- Richard W. Sonnenfeldt, chief interpreter for the U.S. prosecution, Nuremberg Trials
- Michael Trede, German professor and chairman of the Mannheim Surgical Clinics and University of Heidelberg Medical School

== Architectural landmark ==
The main house at Bunce Court is a Grade II listed building. It was listed by English Heritage in December 1984. The main house dates from 1547 and was occupied by the Bunce family. In the 18th century, the front of the building was renovated with mathematical tiles to give it a more contemporary look. In 1896 and 1910, two wings were added. In 1984, it was again renovated and subdivided into four separate residences.

In the 1990s, five additional houses were built on the grounds. Bunce Court Barn, which is between the main house and the new houses, has also been converted into a residence, is also listed.

== See also ==
- List of people who attended Bunce Court School

== Bunce Court memoirs ==
Memoirs by Bunce Court alumni

- Thomas Mayer, in: Roger E. Backhouse, Roger Middleton (eds.), Exemplary Economists, Edward Elgar Publishing Limited. Vol. 1 (2000), pp. 92–108. ISBN 1-85898-959-0
- Michael Trede, Der Rückkehrer. (2003) ecomed verlagsgesellschaft AG & Co. KG, Landsberg, Germany. ISBN 3-609-16172-8 (in German)
- Sidney Finkel, Sevek and the Holocaust: The Boy Who Refused to Die. (2005) self-published. ISBN 0-9763562-0-1
- Peter Morley, OBE, Peter Morley – A Life Rewound. (2006) Bank House Books
- Werner M. Loval, We Were Europeans: A Personal History of a Turbulent Century. (2010/5770) Gefen Publishing House, Ltd. ISBN 978-965-229-522-4
- Michael Roemer, "A Collection of Bunce Court Memories". (Undated). Michael Roemer Papers (MS 1837). Manuscripts and Archives, Yale University Library
- Richard W. Sonnenfeldt, Witness to Nuremberg. (2006) Arcade Publishing, Inc.
- Leslie Baruch Brent, Ein Sonntagskind? – Vom jüdischen Waisenhaus zum weltbekannten Immunologen. (2009) Berliner Wissenschafts-Verlag ISBN 978-3-8305-1702-3 (in German)

Memoirs by Bunce Court staff

- Hanna Bergas, Fifteen Years: Lived among, with and for refugee children, 1933-1948 (PDF) Unpublished. (1979) Palo Alto, California. Manuscript archived at the Leo Baeck Institute / Center for Jewish History, New York
- Hans Meyer, Reflections: Bunce Court. (2004)

Memoirs by Essinger family members

- Dorle M. Potten (née Essinger), Des Kindes Chronik. (2003), reissued 2009. Published privately. Silver End, Witham, Essex (in German)

Interviews with Bunce Court Alumni about their Memories:

- Part I (Chair Daniel Zylbersztajn-Lewandowski) Anna Essinger's School. Part II (Leslie Baruch Brent) and Part III (Ruth Baronow-Danson) You Tube recorded presentation at St. Paul's Steiner Waldorf School, London, about Bunce Court with former Alumni Leslie Baruch Brent and Ruth Boronow-Danson, 29 November 2016, retrieved last 23 July 2022
- Daniel Zylbersztajn: DW Radio, World in Progress: Jewish Child Refugee. with Bunce Court Alumnus Martin Lubowski. 4th of Jan.2016, retrieved last 23 July 2022
