= Lauter (Blau) =

River in Germany

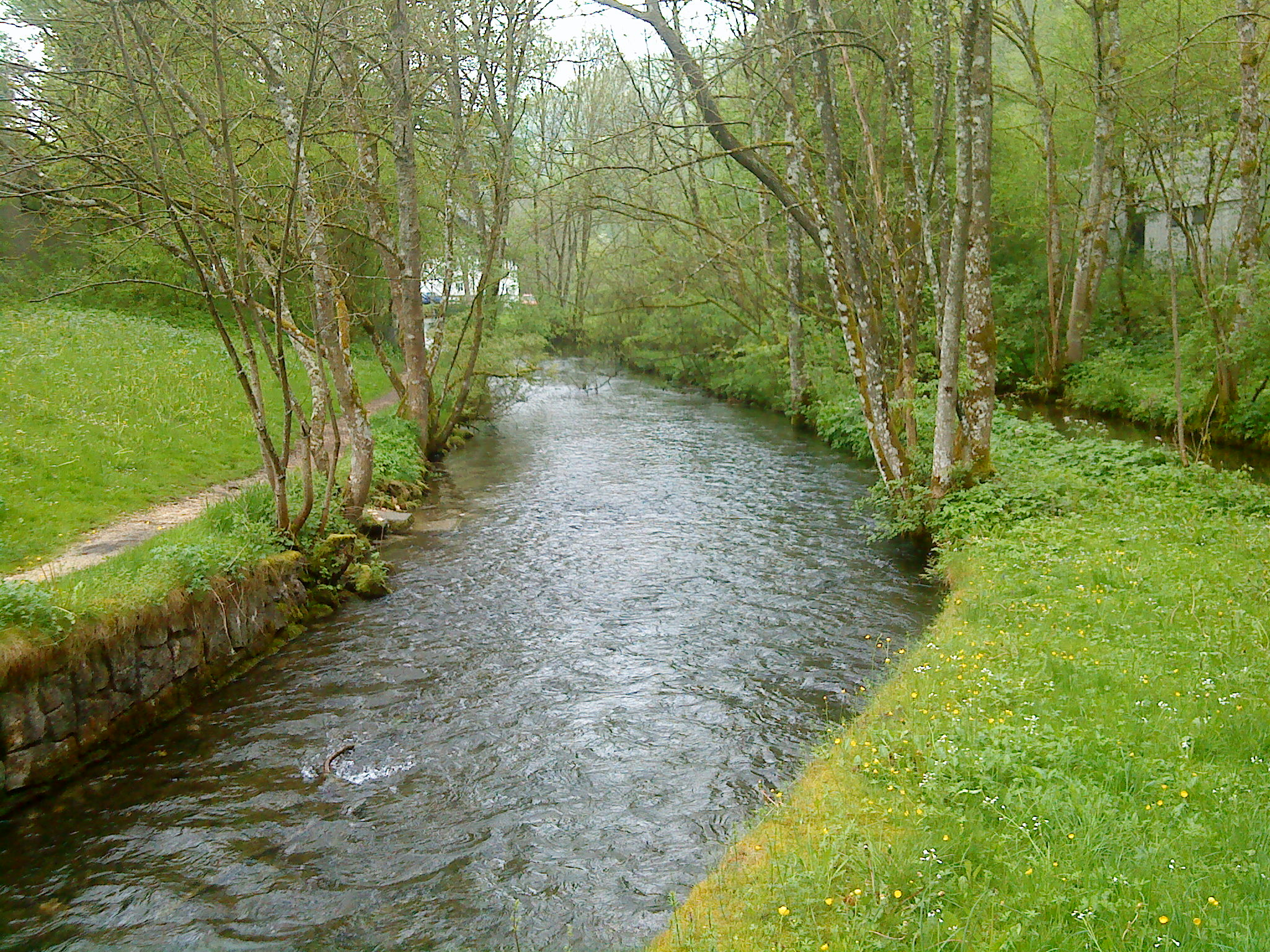

Location
- Country: Germany
- States: Baden-Württemberg

Physical characteristics
- Mouth
  - location: Blau
  - coordinates: 48.4193°N 9.9024°E

Basin features
- Progression: Blau→ Danube→ Black Sea

Lauter (German pronunciation: [ˈlaʊtɐ]) is a small river of Baden-Württemberg, Germany. It is a left tributary of the Blau near Blaustein.

== Geography ==
The Lauter River rises on the southern edge of the Swabian Alb in Lautern, a district of the town of Blaustein, in a karst spring, the Lautertopf. This spring has an average discharge of 600 liters per second and is one of the most powerful springs in the Swabian Alb. Next to the spring is the old pumping station, which supplied several communities with drinking water as early as 1873 as part of the Alb water supply system. The outflowing water flows from the spring in two branches, which rejoin after a few meters.

The Lauter flows southeast through the approximately five-kilometer-long Kleine Lautertal valley. Designated a nature reserve in 1995, it covers 280 hectares

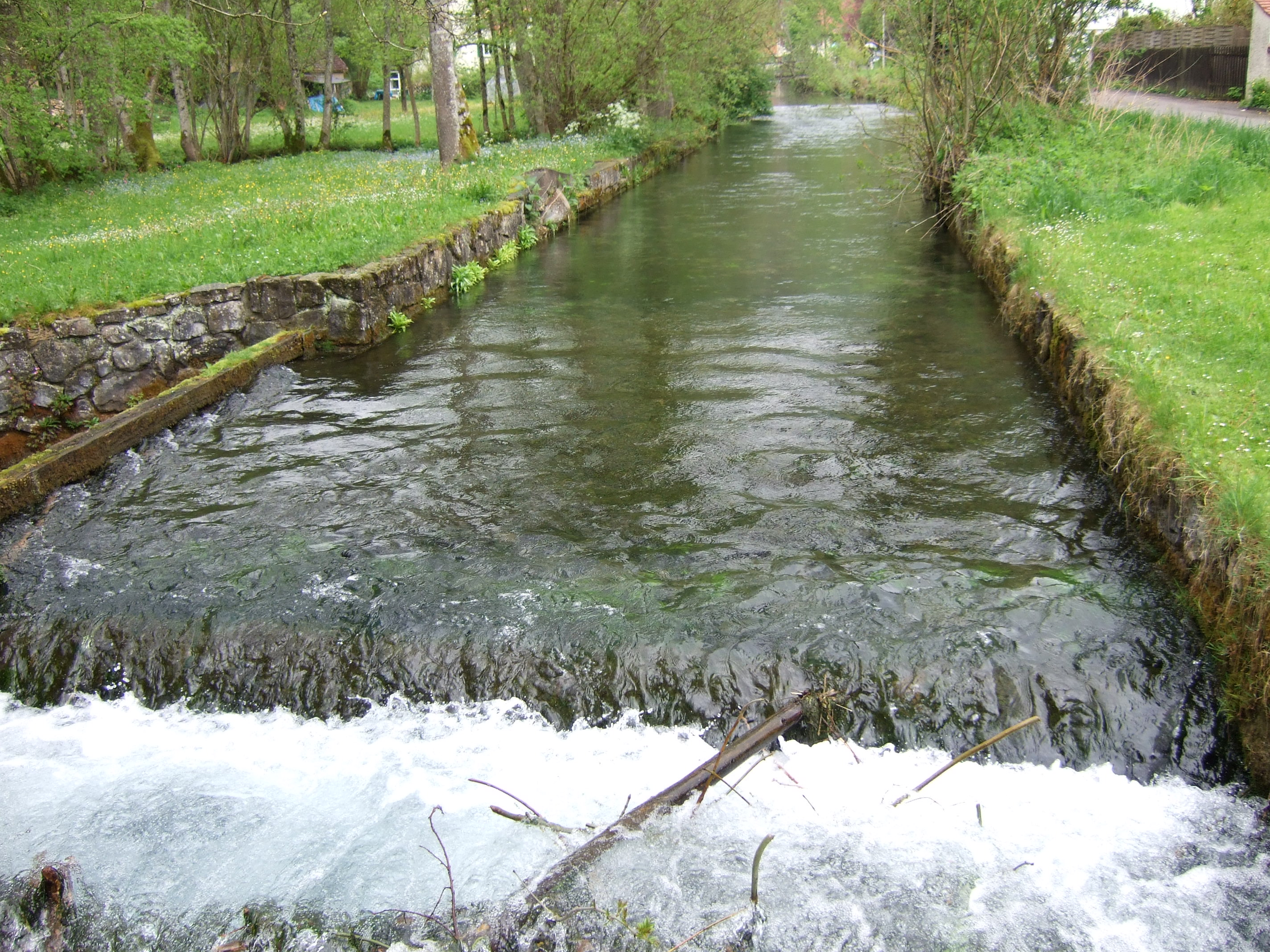
Kleine Lauter.

and is the second largest in the Alb-Donau district.

In Herrlingen, also a district of the town of Blaustein, it flows into the Blau.

== Nature conservation ==
For bird protection reasons, navigation on the Lauter River in the nature reserve is generally prohibited. From the nature reserve boundary at the quarry south of Weidach to Herrlingen, riding is prohibited for individual riders between March 1 and June 30 each year. Exceptions may be granted by the Ulm Nature Conservation Authority. Organized rides, commercial rentals, and events require

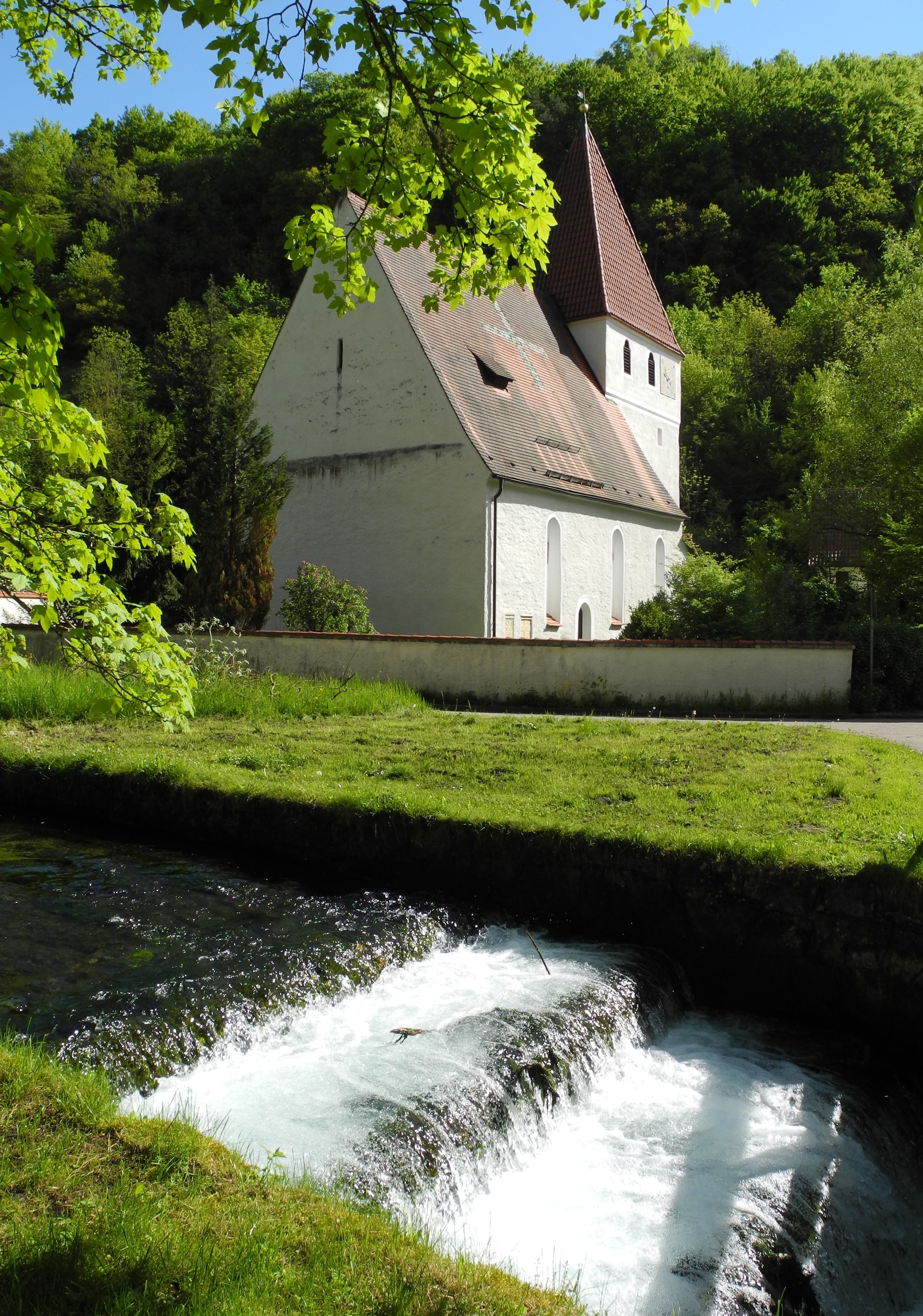

official permission year-round.

== See also ==
- List of rivers of Baden-Württemberg
