= Frank Marcus =

British playwright

- Born: Frank Ulrich Marcus; June 30, 1928; Breslau, Germany
- Died: August 5, 1996 (aged 68); London, England
- Occupation: Playwright
- Writing career
- Language: English
- Genre: Theatre

Frank Ulrich Marcus (30 June 1928 – 5 August 1996) was a British playwright, best known for The Killing of Sister George.

== Life and career ==
Marcus was born 30 June 1928 into a Jewish family in Breslau (then in Germany). They came to England as refugees in 1939. Until 1943, he attended Bunce Court School at Otterden, near Faversham in Kent, (a school founded by Anna Essinger, a German Jewish-Quaker who had started Landschulheim Herrlingen, a private school in southern Germany, which was relocated to England in 1933). He then spent a year at Saint Martin's School of Art.

He started as an actor and playwright with the International Theatre Group and the Unity Theatre. In 1951, he married actress Jacqueline Sylvester, who collaborated with him on some of his plays. His plays were known for their strong parts for female actors, such as in his best known play, The Killing of Sister George, starring Beryl Reid, which was later adapted into the 1968 film of the same name.

When a theatre company in apartheid South Africa asked to put on a production of The Killing of Sister George, Marcus's immediate instinct was to simply refuse. However, after much consideration, he decided instead that he could do more good and make more of a stance by allowing it to be seen there - under the strict proviso that the audiences would be mixed and non-segregated. Every penny this production earned was divided between Amnesty International (specifically for the freeing of South African political prisoners) and a black theatre group in Soweto.

As well as his own plays he made several translations and adaptations from his native German.

He worked as Theatre Critic for The Sunday Telegraph between 1968 and 1978. After a long struggle with Parkinson's disease, he died in London, 5 August 1996.

== Works ==
=== Original plays ===
- 1950 Minuet For Stuffed Birds
- 1964 The Formation Dancers
- 1965 Cleo (one-act)
- 1964 The Killing of Sister George
- 1967 Studies of The Nude
- 1968 Mrs Mouse, Are You Within?
- 1969 The Window
- 1972 Blank Pages
- 1973 Keyholes
- 1972 Christmas Carol (one-act)
- 1972 Notes on a Love Affair
- 1975 Beauty and The Beast (for children)
- 1976 Portrait of The Artist
- 1977 Blind Date (one-act)
- 1978 Ballad of Wilfred II (one-act)
- 1978 The Merman of Orford

=== Adaptations and translations ===
- 1952 Merry-Go-Round (La Ronde) by Arthur Schnitzler
- 1969 The Guardsman by Ferenc Molnár
- 1976 Anatol by Arthur Schnitzler
- 1980 The Weavers by Gerhart Hauptmann
- 1987 From Morning To Midnight by Georg Kaiser
- 1991 La Ronde by Arthur Schnitzler
