= Listed buildings in Otterden =

Historic structures in Kent, England

Otterden is a village and civil parish in the Borough of Maidstone of Kent, England It contains two grade II* and 14 grade II listed buildings that are recorded in the National Heritage List for England.

This list is based on the information retrieved online from Historic England.

== Key ==
Grade	Criteria
I	Buildings that are of exceptional interest
II*	Particularly important buildings of more than special interest
II	Buildings that are of special interest

== Listing ==
Name	Grade	Location	Type	Completed (Note: The date given is the date used by Historic England as significant for the initial building or that of an important part in the structure's description.)	Date designated	Grid ref. (Note: The grid reference is based on the British national grid reference system, sometimes known as OSGB36, used by the Ordnance Survey.) Geo-coordinates	Notes	Entry number (Note: The "List Entry Number" is a unique number assigned to each listed building and scheduled monument by Historic England.)	Image	Wikidata
Otterden Place, and Donkey Wheel Attached	II*	And Donkey Wheel Attached, Bunce Court Road			20 October 1952	TQ9466854202; 51°15′13″N 0°47′18″E		1115729	Otterden Place, and Donkey Wheel Attached More images	Q17545182
Barn Circa 50 Yards South West of Otterden Place	II	Bunce Court Road			14 December 1984	TQ9458254155; 51°15′12″N 0°47′13″E		1320316	Upload Photo	Q26606328
Bunce Court	II	Bunce Court Road			14 December 1984	TQ9391653359; 51°14′47″N 0°46′37″E		1060963	Upload Photo	Q26314105
Church of St Lawrence	II*	Bunce Court Road			26 April 1968	TQ9473154184; 51°15′13″N 0°47′21″E		1060964	Church of St Lawrence More images	Q17545057
Garden Walls Attached to Otterden Place	II	Bunce Court Road			14 December 1984	TQ9468854145; 51°15′12″N 0°47′19″E		1344249	Upload Photo	Q26627986
Lower Stables Flat Stable and Storerooms Circa 35 Yards South West of Otterden Place Upper Stables Flat	II	Bunce Court Road			14 December 1984	TQ9462054157; 51°15′12″N 0°47′15″E		1060965	Upload Photo	Q26314106
The Old Rectory	II	Bunce Court Road			14 December 1984	TQ9444253677; 51°14′57″N 0°47′05″E		1320274	Upload Photo	Q26606292
Cuckoo Wood Farmhouse	II	Coldharbour Road			14 December 1984	TQ9413852964; 51°14′34″N 0°46′48″E		1344250	Upload Photo	Q26627987
Hurst Farmhouse	II	Hurst Wood Road			14 December 1984	TQ9358253696; 51°14′58″N 0°46′21″E		1115701	Upload Photo	Q26409399
Norton Hall	II	Rigshill Road			14 December 1984	TQ9475652970; 51°14′34″N 0°47′20″E		1060966	Upload Photo	Q26314107
Nutshell	II	Rigshill Road			14 December 1984	TQ9470152902; 51°14′31″N 0°47′17″E		1115668	Upload Photo	Q26409366
Rhode Fruit Farmhouse	II	Seed Road			14 December 1984	TQ9320554928; 51°15′39″N 0°46′04″E		1344251	Upload Photo	Q26627988
Lower Slade Farmhouse	II	Slade Road			14 December 1984	TQ9307454621; 51°15′29″N 0°45′56″E		1320311	Upload Photo	Q26606323
Upper Slade Farmhouse	II	Slade Road			14 December 1984	TQ9313754412; 51°15′22″N 0°45′59″E		1060967	Upload Photo	Q26314108
Little Snoad Cottage	II	Snoad Farm Road			26 April 1968	TQ9467654833; 51°15′34″N 0°47′19″E		1115658	Upload Photo	Q26409357
Snoad Farmhouse	II	Snoad Farm Road			26 April 1968	TQ9471455020; 51°15′40″N 0°47′22″E		1060968	Upload Photo	Q26314109

== See also ==
- Grade I listed buildings in Kent
- Grade II* listed buildings in Kent

== Sources ==
- Newman, John (2012) [1969], Kent: West and the Weald, The Buildings of England, New Haven and London: Yale University Press, ISBN 978-0-300-18509-6
