= Peter Morley (filmmaker) =

German-born British television producer and documentary filmmaker (1924–2006)

Peter Morley, OBE (26 June 1924 – 23 June 2016) was a German-born British television producer and documentary filmmaker. As a nine-year-old child, he fled Nazi Germany with his elder siblings and moved to England, where he lived until his death. He made several documentaries about the Holocaust, winning several awards, both in Britain and abroad.

== Early years ==
Born Peter Meyer to Jewish parents, Alice and Willy Meyer, a wholesaler and exporter in Germany, he fled the Nazis in 1933 at the age of nine with his brother Tommy and his sister Anne-Marie Meyer (future Registrar of the Warburg Institute and literary executor of Arnaldo Momigliano). His parents had already decided the family should leave Germany, but when Adolf Hitler was made chancellor of Germany, plans were put into action. His parents learned that the Landschulheim Herrlingen, a progressive, co-educational school in Ulm, was moving to England, and he and his siblings were accepted.

Arriving in England, he and his siblings attended the Bunce Court School in Otterden, Kent. His first documentary film was about the school. Anna Essinger, a German educator, founded Bunce Court after she realised that the Nazis had turned Germany into a hostile environment for educating children. Moving quickly and discreetly, she relocated her boarding school in the south of Germany, along with its 66 mostly Jewish pupils, to safety in England. The school became Morley's home until 1941 and his first film was a documentary about Bunce Court.

When his brother volunteered for military service, as a "stateless enemy alien", he was made to change his last name, in case of capture by Germans. His brother arbitrarily picked the name "Morley" and Peter followed suit. The Morley brothers fought with the 8th Hussars, a British tank regiment, towards the end of the war. Morley became a naturalised British citizen in June 1947.

== Career ==
In one of Morley's first job interviews as he tried to break into the film industry, Sir Arthur Elton told him: "You will never make a career in the film industry as I cannot detect one spark of talent." Morley faced a problem of needing a union card to get a job, and a job to get a union card. As a result, his first civilian job after the war was as a projectionist, making £5 a week. The job was with the Film Producers Guild, a collective of documentary film companies, and became his introduction to both the process of and people in filmmaking. Using a 16mm magazine Cine-Kodak he had acquired by barter in Berlin in July 1945, Morley produced a film about Bunce Court, shortly before the school closed. Called Once Upon a Time, the film won a special commendation from the board of Amateur Cine World, and 50 years later, provided archival footage for U.S. and German documentaries about the 1939 Kindertransport and related topics. It was not until 1950 that Morley was finally able to break into the industry, but he had to accept a demotion to "tea boy" and his wages, which had risen to £7 a week, were cut to £4. The job did eventually lead to a job in film editing and a union card.

Morley became a television producer in England, working for Associated-Rediffusion in Independent Television's infancy. In February 1959, he and former Fleet Street journalist Cyril Bennett interviewed Paula Hitler, as well as Hitler's adjutant, chauffeur and pilot—the only interviews that those people ever gave. At that time, with much of Germany and London still in ruins from the war, neither Morley nor Bennett had ever seen a programme about Hitler. The interview with Hitler's sister was included in Tyranny: The Years of Adolf Hitler, which was seen by 10 million people. Following that success, Morley made films on a variety of topics, including an original studio production of Benjamin Britten's opera The Turn of the Screw; life in post-war Japan; the work of members of the London Symphony Orchestra; and in 1964, racially mixed marriages, a very controversial subject at the time. He went on to direct the BAFTA-winning television coverage of the state funeral of Sir Winston Churchill and the "monumental" television series The Life and Times of Lord Mountbatten before moving to the new Yorkshire Television.

In 1978, Morley produced the award-winning Women of Courage about four women who risked their lives to save others during the Nazi era, Hiltgunt Zassenhaus, a German; Sigrid Helliesen Lund, a Norwegian pacifist; Mary Lindell, an Englishwoman; and Maria Rutkiewicz, a Pole. Also in 1978, he produced Kitty – Return to Auschwitz about Kitty Hart's return to Auschwitz, which won six awards from different countries.

Morley published his autobiography, A Life Rewound: Memoirs Of A Freelance Producer And Director, in book form in November 2010.

== Awards ==
- 1963 This Week – 1963 BAFTA Current Affairs Award
- 1965 Churchill State Funeral – BAFTA Outside Broadcasts Award
- 1965 Churchill State Funeral – Cannes Grand Prix
- 1969 The Life and Times of Lord Mountbatten – Royal Television Society Silver Medal
- 1973 The Mighty Continent – Columbia Film Festival Award
- 1978 Women of Courage – Sapporo Documentary Award
- 1978 Kitty – Return to Auschwitz – Royal Television Society Documentary Award, Commonwealth Film & Television Award
- 1981 Kitty – Return to Auschwitz – Berlin Prix Futura, Clarion Award – Best US Network Program
- 1985 Kitty – Return to Auschwitz – World Television Tokyo Prize

== Bibliography ==
- "Peter Morley – A Life Rewound" Part 1 (PDF) British Academy of Film and Television Arts (2006), pp. i–64. Retrieved 29 September 2011
- "Peter Morley – A Life Rewound" Part 2 (PDF) British Academy of Film and Television Arts (2006), pp. 65–135. Retrieved 29 September 2011
- "Peter Morley – A Life Rewound" Part 3 (PDF) British Academy of Film and Television Arts (2006), pp. 137–201. Retrieved 29 September 2011
- "Peter Morley – A Life Rewound" Part 4 (PDF) British Academy of Film and Television Arts (2006), pp. 202–262. Retrieved 29 September 2011
