= Anna Essinger =

German-Jewish educator (1879–1960)

- Born: 15 September 1879; Ulm, Germany
- Died: 30 May 1960 (aged 80); Otterden, Kent, England
- Citizenship: German, English
- Education: University of Wisconsin (M.A.)
- Occupations: Educator, co-founder of Landschulheim Herrlingen
- Years active: early 1900s - 1948
- Known for: escaping Nazi Germany in 1933 with her entire school and for helping child refugees and Nazi concentration camp survivors

Anna Essinger (15 September 1879 – 30 May 1960) was a German Jewish educator. At the age of 20, she went to finish her education in the United States, where she encountered Quakers and was greatly influenced by their attitudes, adopting them for her own. In 1919, she returned to Germany on a Quaker war relief mission and was asked by her sister, who had founded a children's home, to help establish a school with it. She and her family founded a boarding school, the Landschulheim Herrlingen in 1926, with Anna Essinger as headmistress. In 1933, with the Nazi threat looming and the permission of all the parents, she moved the school and its 66 children, mostly Jewish, to safety in England, re-establishing it as the Bunce Court School. During the war, Essinger established a reception camp for 10,000 German children sent to England on the Kindertransports, taking some of them into the school. After the war, her school took many child survivors of Nazi concentration camps. By the time Essinger closed Bunce Court in 1948, she had taught and cared for over 900 children, most of whom called her Tante ("Aunt") Anna, or TA, for short. She remained in close contact with her former pupils for the rest of her life.

== Early years ==
Essinger was born on Hafengasse ("Harbor Lane") in Ulm, the oldest of six girls and three boys, to a non-observant Jewish couple, Fanny (née Oppenheimer) and Leopold Essinger. (Note: Anna Essinger's siblings were Marie (Levistein), Klara (Weimersheimer), Will (b. November 1, 1884), Ida, Fritz, Max, Paula and Berthe (Kahn). Will celebrated his 80th birthday in 1964. He was an active Zionist and had a "collection of old and classic works on bees". Berthe was born in 1896 and died on April 27, 1994, at age 97. She had three children, Liselotte, Ruth and Walter. Paula Essinger's 1975 obituary in the precursor to the AJR Journal said that Berthe and Marie, then "a sprightly 93", survived her.) Her grandfather was David Essinger (1817–1899), a doctor. Leopold Essinger had an insurance business and served in World War I in Verdun, France. While in the imperial German army, he became convinced that there was widespread antisemitism among the officers.

In 1899, at the age of 20, Essinger went to the United States to live with her aunt in Nashville, Tennessee. While in Tennessee, she became acquainted with Quakers, becoming deeply impressed and beginning a lifelong association with them. She graduated from college with a degree in German studies, financing her education by teaching German and by running a private students' hostel, which she founded. She later received an M.A. in education at the University of Wisconsin, became a teacher and lectured at the university in Madison, Wisconsin. Working with Quaker-sponsored humanitarian aid, she returned to Germany in 1919. Her task was to convince mayors, teachers and school rectors to set up kitchens so that children could have a hot meal once a day. She also collected food and clothing.

In 1912, using her dowry, her sister, Klara Weimersheimer, founded an orphanage in Herrlingen, where she cared for problem children, as well as those mentally unstable and disabled. In 1925, as her own children and many of the children in care came of school age, she got the idea to turn the orphanage into a Landschulheim (boarding school). Several members of the Essinger family became involved, paving the way for it to open a year later. The Landschulheim Herrlingen opened on 1 May 1926 as a private boarding school with 18 children ranging in age from 6 to 12. Anna Essinger became headmistress and her sister Paula (1892–1975), a trained nurse, became the school nurse and its housekeeper.

== Educational reform ==
While in the United States, Essinger learned about and became influenced by progressive education, then a new pedagogy. She ran Landschulheim Herrlingen like a Montessori program, placing high value on communal living, mutual respect and a shared sense of responsibility for the school. Each and every one, whether teacher or pupil, was to feel responsible to the community. The school was non-denominational, accepting children from all religions, coeducational and the pupils were on a first name basis with the teachers, who also lived at the school.

Essinger was described as a "formidable figure", "stout and stern" and as having the children's welfare at heart. She was a strict disciplinarian with both staff and pupils, but provided a loving, family environment. Most staff and pupils called her "Tante Anna" (Aunt Anna) or just TA, for short.

The children learned two languages from the first day of school on, with emphasis on the spoken, rather than the written word. Essinger believed that children should have physical exercise before breakfast. and great emphasis was placed on physical exercise. Learning was accomplished through living, whether from daily walks in the woods, from the tasks required of the children in and around the building, or at meal time, where there were "English" and "French" tables and those sitting at them would speak in those languages during the meal. The arts were also offered. In addition to painting, drawing, singing and drama, the children learned to play music. In the evening, Anna Essinger read a story and then gave each child a "good night kiss" before sending them off to bed. A 1927 report by the Ministry of Science, Art and Education (Ministerium für Wissenschaft, Kunst und Volksbildung) described Essinger as "extremely competent" and her teaching as "skillful, fresh and stimulating".

== Nazi era ==
Adolf Hitler's rise to power and the growing Nazi threat were viewed ominously by Essinger, who immediately went about quietly boycotting the Third Reich. All public buildings were ordered to fly the Nazi flag with its swastika on Hitler's birthday in 1933, so Essinger planned a day of hiking for the pupils, leaving the flag to fly over an empty building. Essinger said, "Atop an empty building, the flag can neither convey nor harm as much." She was denounced within the Nazi Party and the Nazi authorities' attitude toward the school became increasingly negative. It was recommended that an inspector be installed at the school. Essinger, realizing that her school had no future in Germany, and encouraged by her father to leave the country, (Note: Leopold Essinger persuaded his entire family to leave the country.) began to look abroad for a new home for the school. After looking in Switzerland and the Netherlands, she found a property in southern England. The children's parents were informed and gave their approval for Essinger and her teachers to take 66 children out of Germany. Essinger arranged a well-disguised trip for the group and on September 5, 1933, they arrived in southern England. Astutely, Essinger did not formally close the school, but turned it over to Hugo Rosenthal. It became a home for Jewish children and a center for Jewish life in southern Germany, with an enrollment of more than 100 children.

An old manor house dating from the time of Henry VIII was found in the village of Otterden near Faversham, in the County of Kent. The house was large, with extensive grounds, making it ideal for a boarding school. Funds were meager, so work on the property was done by the staff and pupils, causing British education inspectors to view the new school unfavorably at the outset. In 1933, England was still secure and war had not yet broken out and people were not aware of what was going on in Germany and why Essinger and the school had left. Within a year or two, however, enough improvements had been made that local officials realized the school was quite special; Essinger won the respect of the local authorities and had advocates from all areas of public life. She sought English host families for children to visit on weekends; and at the school, held concerts, theatrical programs, sports contests and an annual "Open Day", involving the children in English life and the community with the school.

After Kristallnacht, on 9–10 November 1938, Essinger was asked to set up a reception camp in Dovercourt for 10,000 German children who would be arriving on the Kindertransports. Essinger, then nearly 60 years old, worked with three teachers, her cook and six of the older pupils to establish the camp, taking some of them into her school. With this, she also sought out families and homes to care for refugee children. Local British committees sought out placements for the children and tried to match children with families where they would fit in. However, the manner in which it was done appalled Essinger, who likened it to a "cattle market", where attractive children were chosen, but less attractive ones were not, lowering morale. The experience of running the reception camp and placing the children was so difficult, that afterward, Essinger refused to talk about it.

In 1940, the school again had to evacuate when southern England became a defence area. Essinger and about 100 children and teachers relocated the school to "Trench Hall" in Shropshire. They were not able to return to Bunce Court until 1946. Having finished her life's work, Essinger closed the school in 1948 and retired.

== Later years ==
Over the course of 22 years, Essinger cared for and taught over 900 children. As the Nazis extended their reach, the children came first from Germany, then Austria, Poland, Czechoslovakia and England. The last years were particularly difficult. Her eyesight was failing, but more significantly, the last children to arrive at her school were Nazi concentration camp survivors who no longer knew what normal life was like, and sometimes found it very difficult to adjust to.

After she closed her school, Essinger spent her remaining years living at Bunce Court, and maintained correspondence with her former pupils. She helped both children and adults in distress with her motto, "Give children a hand, give them a chance".

== Legacy and honours ==
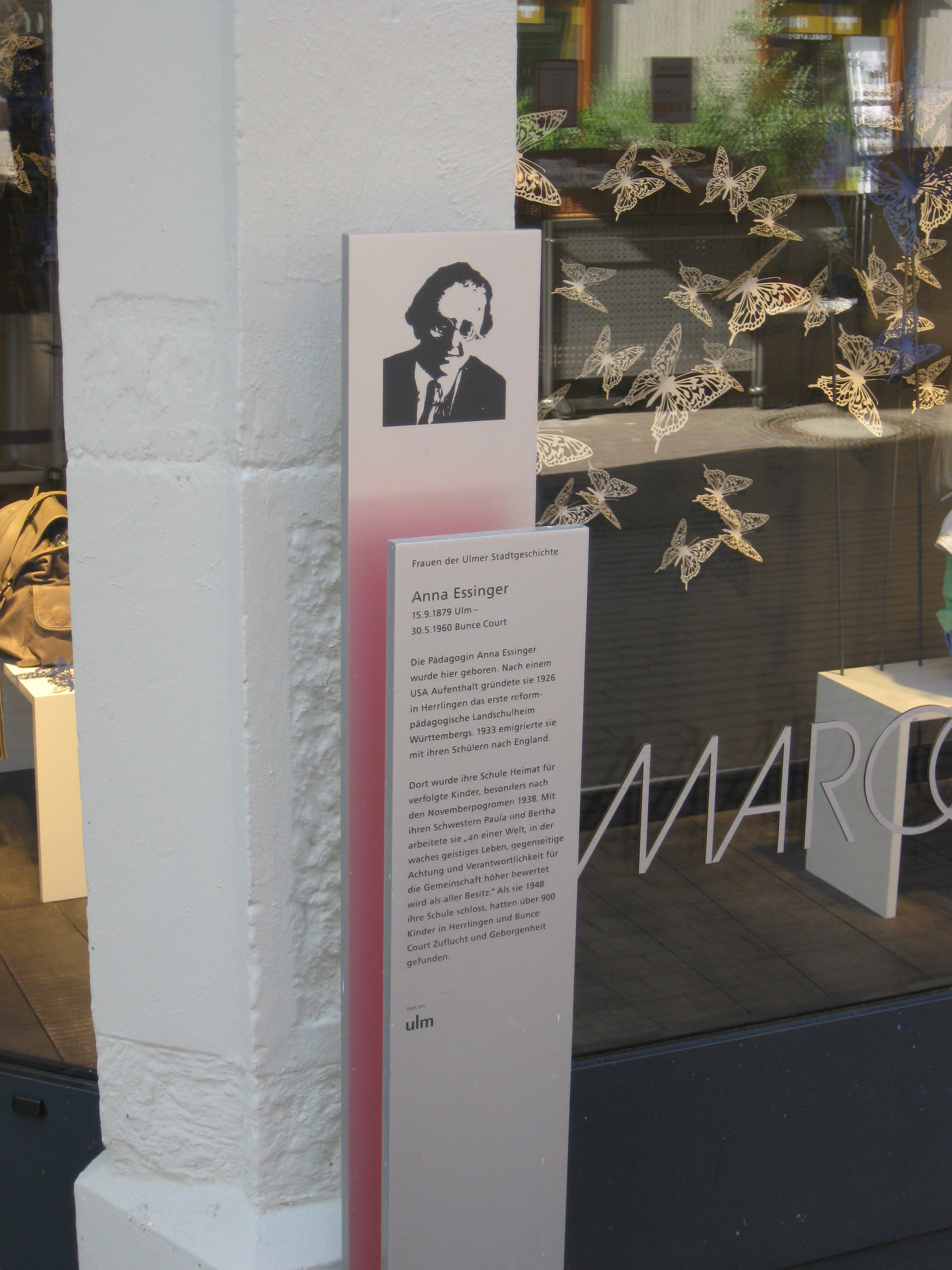
Commemorative plaque for Anna Essinger in downtown Ulm

Many of Essinger's pupils went on to distinguished careers, including Frank Auerbach, Leslie Brent, Gerard Hoffnung, Frank Marcus, Peter Morley, and Helmut and Richard Sonnenfeldt. Bunce Court alumni returned at every opportunity while the school was still in existence; after it closed, they held reunions for 55 years.

In 1959, in honour of Essinger's 80th birthday, Bunce Court alumni planted a grove of trees in Israel that was named after her.

In 1990, a realschule (secondary school) in Ulm and a Kuhberg gymnasium were named for Anna Essinger. Some of her personal papers are archived at the Ida Seele Archive in Dillingen an der Donau. The archive is devoted to research of the history of education and social pedagogy. In July 2007, the original Bunce Court school bell was retrieved from California, where it had been saved and stored by Ernst Weinberg, a former pupil, and was reinstalled on top of the schoolhouse. A plaque honoring Essinger and the school was erected at the same time.

In 2004, the Oxford Dictionary of National Biography added an entry for Essinger, unusual for someone who became a naturalized British citizen late in life. Also in 2004, the city of Ulm celebrated its 1,150th anniversary and along with it, the birthdays of Anna Essinger and Albert Einstein, both born there. The celebration for Essinger lasted a week and was attended by family members from the United Kingdom and Israel, as well as Germany; and former students.

== Manuscripts ==
- Anna Essinger, Goethe and Saint-Simon (1917) HathiTrust Digital Library. Original from the University of Wisconsin.

== Bibliography ==
- Manfred Berger: Anna Essinger – Gründerin eines Landerziehungsheims. Eine biographisch-pädagogische Skizze. In: Zeitschrift für Erlebnispädagogik 17,4 (1997), pp. 47–52 (in German)
- Sara Giebeler u.a.: Profile jüdischer Pädagoginnen und Pädagogen. Klemm und Oelschläger, Ulm (2000) (= Edition Haus unterm Regenbogen, 3), ISBN 3-932577-23-X (in German)
- Lucie Schachner: Education towards spiritual resistance : the Jewish Landschulheim Herrlingen, 1933 to 1939. dipa-Verlag, Frankfurt am Main (1988) Vol. 3, ISBN 3-7638-0510-9
- Dietrich Winter: Herrlingen als literarischer und historischer Ort: Begegnung mit außergewöhnlichen Persönlichkeiten in Zeiten der Entscheidung. Vortrag, gehalten am 9. November 1997 (...) im Rahmen des "Veranstaltungsprojekts Dichter und Richter – Deutsche Literatur in der Entscheidung. 50 Jahre Gruppe 47" von der Ulmer Volkshochschule. Klemm und Oelschläger, Ulm (1998) (= Edition Haus unterm Regenbogen, 1), ISBN 3-932577-12-4 (in German)
- Hildegard Feidel-Mertz, translated by Andrea Hammel, "Integration and Formation of Identity: Exile Schools in Great Britain" in: Shofar: An Interdisciplinary Journal of Jewish Studies, University of Nebraska Press (Fall 2004). Volume 23, Number 1, pp. 71–84

== See also ==
- Else Hirsch – helped organize 10 Kindertransports to the Netherlands and England
- List of people who attended Bunce Court School
- Part I Anna Essinger's School.Part II und Part III YouTube recorded presentation at St. Paul's Steiner Waldorf School, London, with former pupils Leslie Baruch Brent and Ruth Boronow-Danson, 29 November 2016, chaired by German-Jewish Journalist Daniel Zylbersztajn-Lewandowski, retrieved last July 23, 2022
- Daniel Zylbersztajn: Reformpädagogik: Eine Schwäbin in Kent. In: Jüdische Allgemeine, 10.5.2016, retrieved last July 23, 2022
- Daniel Zylbersztajn: DW Radio, World in Progress: Jewish Child Refugee. with Bunce Court Alumnus Martin Lubowski. 4th of Jan.2016, retrieved July 23, 2022
