= Wilhelm Marckwald =

Wilhelm Marckwald was a German actor and director in both theatre and film. He went to Spain in 1933, fleeing to Stockholm as the political situation heated up. Accused of being a communist, he and his wife were forced to leave Sweden for France. As World War II broke out, they made their way to England.

== Biographical details ==
Marckwald was born to a family related to the wife of painter Max Liebermann, Martha, née Marckwald.

Marckwald first worked as a businessman, then became a musician and played in a café. He then became an actor and then began directing. In 1929 and 1930, he worked with actor P. Walter Jacob at the Stadttheater Koblenz and was a senior producer at the Deutsches Theater in Berlin. He left Germany in 1933, then went to Spain, where he became known as Guillermo Marckwald, and began directing films in Barcelona. He was married to a Spanish actress, Pilar, and in 1936, they fled Francisco Franco and his troops. They went to Stockholm, but Marckwald was accused of being a communist and they were expelled to France. As war broke out, they fled to England.

In 1942, Marckwald and his wife arrived at Trench Hall, where, because of restrictions on employment, Marckwald became the boilerman for the school and did gardening. His wife worked in the kitchen. Marckwald immediately formed a theatrical group at the school and began organizing plays. Among those in his theatre group were Frank Auerbach, Michael Roemer and Michael Trede. Decades later, Roemer named Marckwald in the acknowledgments in his 1997 book, Telling Stories

== Family ==
His father, Fritz Marckwald (October 1871 – 14 September 1942) and mother were both baptized Protestant, but were nonetheless deported as Jews by the Nazis and perished in the Theresienstadt ghetto. While they were in the Judenhaus in Dresden, awaiting deportation, Victor Klemperer came to know them and wrote about them in his diary, published decades later in 1995, Ich will Zeugnis ablegen bis zum letzten, I Will Bear Witness to the Bitter End, translated into English in three volumes.

Michael Trede described reading the diaries decades later, in which one passage relates what the Marckwalds had said about their son; Trede realized that the son described was his old drama teacher. In Trede's memoir, the description of this moment is followed by an excerpt from a letter written to his mother about Wilhelm and Pilar Marckwald's arrival at Trench Hall.

== Theatre at Trench Hall ==
Performances were already a regular feature at Bunce Court, a German-Jewish boarding school that had left Nazi Germany for Kent, England and become a haven for refugees, both pupils and staff. After England declared war on Germany, the school was evacuated to Trench Hall in Wem, Shropshire and the frequent performances continued. They were considered a welcome distraction, sometimes prepared by children or adult residents, sometimes by outsiders. Marckwald began organizing a theatre group and treated them as he had his professional adult actors, as Trede wrote in a letter to his mother, dated 26 November 1942. He described an improvisational exercise the children were given: a person entering a house in some fashion at some point in time and finding a letter on a table. "That's what we had to act out and he seemed to be very pleased. Then there was a long discussion about our performance and our prospects."

Marckwald directed a production (in English) of Lady Precious Stream that one viewer stated was so professional that the performers did not seem like children. It was performed on 8 May 1943 in Shrewsbury and was written up in the newspaper. Some productions were in German, others in English. There were scenes from George Bernard Shaw's Saint Joan and Gotthold Ephraim Lessing's Minna von Barnhelm; and Der Tor und der Tod by Hugo von Hofmannsthal, performed in its entirety.
