= The Killing of Sister George =

1964 play by Frank Marcus

- Original language: English
- Written by: Frank Marcus

Premiere
- Date: April 20, 1965
- Place: Bristol Old Vic

The Killing of Sister George is a 1964 play by Frank Marcus that was later adapted into a 1968 film directed by Robert Aldrich.

== Stage version ==
Sister George is a beloved character in the popular radio series Applehurst, a district nurse who ministers to the medical needs and personal problems of the local villagers. She is played by June Buckridge, who in real life is a gin-guzzling, cigar-chomping, slightly sadistic masculine woman, the antithesis of the sweet character she plays. She is often called George in real life, and lives with Alice "Childie" McNaught, a younger dimwitted woman she often verbally and sometimes physically abuses. When George discovers that her character is scheduled to be killed off, she becomes increasingly impossible to work and live with. Mercy Croft, an executive at the radio station, intercedes in her professional and personal lives, supposedly to help, but she actually has an agenda of her own.

Although it is strongly implied that George and Childie are lesbians, and towards the end it is suggested that Mercy could be as well, this is never explicitly stated. Marcus intended the play to be a farce, not a serious treatment of lesbianism, but because there was so little material about lesbians, it became treated as such.

The story is usually regarded as a parody of the killing of Grace Archer in The Archers (an episode much better known at the time the play was written than it would be in the 21st century). It may also have been inspired by the sacking of actress Ellis Powell from Mrs Dale's Diary, and has sometimes been compared with What Ever Happened to Baby Jane?. The death of Martha Longhurst (played by actress Lynne Carol) in the British television serial Coronation Street in 1964 may also have been an inspiration.

The Killing of Sister George premiered at the Bristol Old Vic on 20 April 1965, in a production directed by Val May. After a tour, the production moved to the Duke of York's Theatre in London, opening on 17 June 1965, with the original cast including Beryl Reid as June Buckridge, Eileen Atkins as Childie and Lally Bowers as Mercy Croft. In April 1966, the production moved to St Martin's Theatre. On 5 October 1966, the show opened at the Belasco Theatre in New York City, with the original cast of Reid, Atkins and Bowers. Hermione Baddeley, Andrée Melly and Ambrosine Phillpotts had taken over their roles at St Martin's in July 1966. Reid won the 1966 Tony Award for Best Performance by a Leading Actress in a Play for the Broadway production.

A West End revival in 1995 starred Miriam Margolyes, Serena Evans and Josephine Tewson. In 2011, a revival at the Arts Theatre in London featured Meera Syal as George. Directed by Iqbal Khan, the cast also included Elizabeth Cadwallader, Belinda Lang, and Helen Lederer.

In Australia, in 2016, a 50th anniversary production of the play was produced by G.bod Theatre for Mardi Gras Festival at the King Street Theatre directed by Peter Mountford and featuring Deborah Jones as June Buckridge.

== Film adaptation ==
In 1968, the play was adapted into a feature film which was somewhat darker and made the lesbian elements more explicit.

== Radio adaptation ==
John Tydeman adapted and directed the play for BBC Radio 4. Broadcast on April 25, 2009, Sarah Badel played George, Lucy Whybrow played Childie and Anna Massey played Mercy.

== Awards and nominations ==
=== Original Broadway production ===
Year	Award	Category	Nominee	Result
1967	Tony Awards	Best Play		Nominated
1967	Tony Awards	Best Actress in a Play	Beryl Reid	Won
1967	Tony Awards	Best Actress in a Play	Eileen Atkins	Nominated
