= Helmut Sonnenfeldt =

Counselor of the United States Department of State (1974 – 1977)

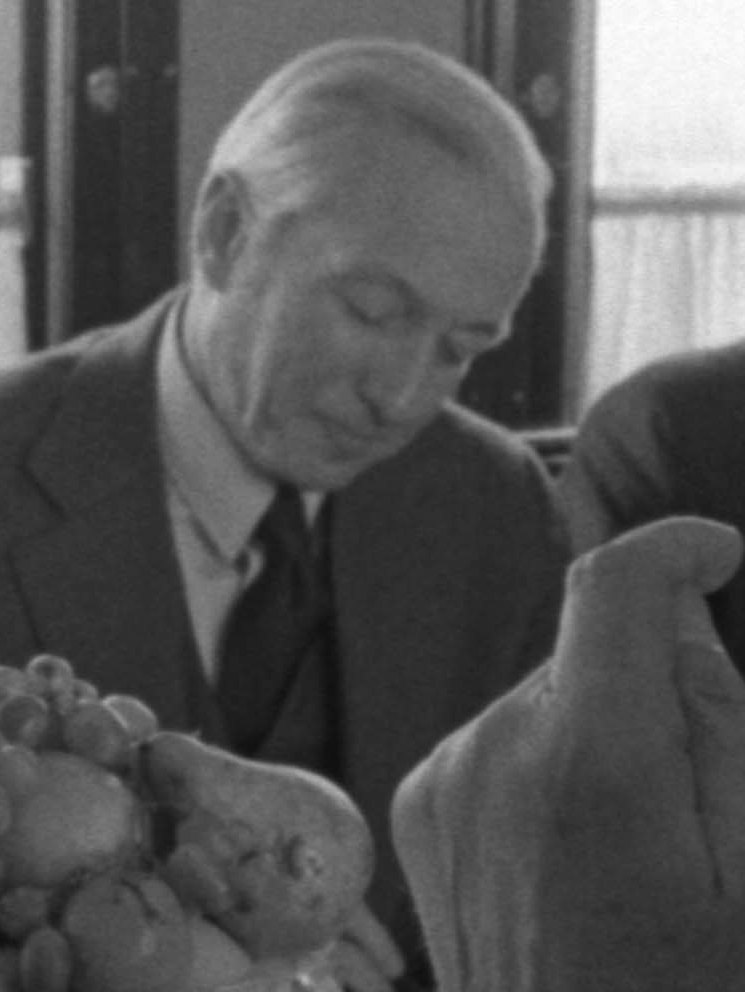
- Sonnenfeldt in 1974, accompanying President Ford to the Vladivostok Summit Meeting on Arms Control

17th Counselor of the United States Department of State
- In office January 7, 1974 – February 21, 1977
- President: Richard Nixon; Gerald Ford
- Preceded by: Richard F. Pedersen
- Succeeded by: Matthew Nimetz

Personal details
- Born: September 13, 1926 Berlin, Germany
- Died: November 18, 2012 (aged 86) Chevy Chase, Maryland
- Education: Bunce Court School; Johns Hopkins University

Helmut Sonnenfeldt (September 13, 1926 – November 18, 2012), also known as Hal Sonnenfeldt, was an American foreign policy expert. He was known as Kissinger’s Kissinger for his philosophical affinity with and influence on Henry A. Kissinger, the architect of American foreign policy in the Nixon and Ford administrations.

He was a veteran staff member of the United States National Security Council, and held several advisory posts in the U.S. government and the private sector. Later in life he was a visiting scholar at the Johns Hopkins School of Advanced International Studies and a guest scholar at the Brookings Institution.

== Early life ==
Sonnenfeldt was born in 1926 in Berlin, Germany, to Drs. Walther and Gertrud (Liebenthal) Sonnenfeldt. His family was Jewish. He spent his childhood in Gardelegen, Germany, where his parents had a family medical practice. In 1938, Sonnenfeldt was sent to Anna Essinger's Bunce Court School in England, as was his brother, Richard Sonnenfeldt. Helmut Sonnenfeldt remained in England until 1944, when he immigrated to the United States and rejoined his parents, who had resettled in Baltimore, Maryland. He entered the U.S. Army in 1944, became a naturalized American citizen and served in both the Philippines and in the U.S. occupation forces in Germany.

After military service, he attended Johns Hopkins University (BA 1950, MA 1951, Johns Hopkins School of Advanced International Studies).

== Career ==
Sonnenfeldt entered service in the U.S. Department of State in 1952 as a member of the staff of the Office of Research on the Soviet Union and Eastern Europe, and served as the Director of that Office from 1963 to 1969.

Within days of the 1968 Nixon election, Henry Kissinger picked him to serve on the National Security Council staff. He was a senior staff member of the National Security Council from 1969 to 1974. In 1974, he was appointed Counselor of the U.S. Department of State, where he served from 1974, continuing after Nixon's resignation for the duration of the Ford administration.

During his time in the National Security Council and in the State Department, he was a close assistant and adviser of Kissinger and became known as "Kissinger's Kissinger."

On the 7th January 1971 Sonnenfeldt, in a memo regarding US / Soviet relations complained to Henry Kissinger that he had been excluded from Kissinger's confidence. "My undoubted personal disappointment that you have almost completely excluded me from participation in or even knowledge of the more sensitive aspects of our dealings with the USSR."

After leaving government service, he was a visiting scholar at the Johns Hopkins School of Advanced International Studies. Since 1978, he had been a Guest Scholar at the Brookings Institution in Washington, D.C.

== Family ==
In 1953, he married Marjorie Hecht. They had three children: Babette Hecht, Walter Herman and Stewart Hecht.

== Death ==
Sonnenfeldt died on Sunday, November 18, 2012 after a long illness, leaving behind his wife and their three children. The cause was complications of Alzheimer’s disease. As a veteran, he was interred at Arlington National Cemetery. His brother was Richard Sonnenfeldt, an American engineer also noted for being the U.S. prosecution team's chief interpreter in 1945 at the Nuremberg Trial after World War II.

== Publications ==
Books

- Soviet Style in International Politics. Washington, DC: Washington Institute for Values in Public Policy (1985) ISBN 978-0887020100
- Soviet Politics in the 1980s. Boulder: Westview Press (1985) ISBN 978-0865318632
- Soviet Perspectives on Security. Adelphi papers, no. 150. London: International Institute for Strategic Studies (1979) ISBN 978-0860790273 – with William G. Hyland

Book contributions

- "The Chinese Factor in Soviet Disarmament Policy" (Chapter 4). In: Halperin, Morton H. (editor). Sino-Soviet Relations and Arms Control. Cambridge: MIT Press (1967): 95-113. LCCN 67-12053

"Written under the auspices of the Center for International Affairs and the East Asian Research Center, Harvard University."

Interviews

- Kennedy, Charles Stuart. "Interview with Helmut Sonnenfeldt." Association for Diplomatic Studies and Training (July 24, 2000) Foreign Affairs Oral History Project.

== Awards ==
- 1997 Leo Baeck Medal
- U.S. Navy Superior Public Service Award

Sonnenfeldt has also been honored by the governments of France, Germany, Luxembourg, and Sweden.
