= Thomas Mayer (American economist) =

American economist

- Born: January 18, 1927; Vienna, Austria
- Died: June 12, 2015 (aged 88)

Academic background
- Education: Columbia University
- Influences: John Maynard Keynes

Academic work
- Discipline: Monetary economics
- School or tradition: Neo-Keynesian economics
- Institutions: University of California, Davis
- Website: Information at IDEAS / RePEc

Thomas Mayer (January 18, 1927 – June 12, 2015) was an Austrian-born American economist who was professor of economics at the University of California, Davis. He previously taught at West Virginia University, the University of Notre Dame, Michigan State University, and the University of California, Berkeley.

He is known for his work in monetary policy and economic methodology. Mayer received his Ph.D. from Columbia University in 1953.

== Early life ==
Mayer was an only child born to middle-class Jewish parents in Vienna, Austria, in 1927. He was not a good student, except for subjects that he liked and only barely passed the test to enter gymnasium. The Anschluss made it difficult for his father to find work and the family began trying to get out of Austria in 1938. The difficulty was to get a visa to enter another country; leaving Austria was then not a problem.

Mayer's parents applied for a visa in March 1938. Because England was accepting refugee children, Mayer was able to get a visa, but had to leave alone in September 1938, without his parents. His father was arrested in November and was released on the condition that he leave Austria within 48 hours, enabling him—but not his wife—to also get a visa to Britain. In November 1941, his mother received a visa to the United States and left on the last boat before Pearl Harbor, after which transit would have been impossible.

Mayer's father was interned as an "enemy alien" in England, following the outbreak of war and the issuance of Defence Regulation 18b and British concern about a fifth column of Nazi collaborators forming in England. He was released in 1942 and was allowed to work, enabling him to take care of his son. He sent Mayer to Bunce Court School, then in Shropshire, where it had been evacuated for the war's duration. The family wasn't reunited until 1944. His death was announced on June 12, 2015.

== Selected works ==
- Monetary Policy in the United States, Permanent Income, Wealth and Consumption, Intermediate Macroeconomics
- The Structure of Monetarism
- Money, Banking and the Economy
- Revealing Monetary Policy
- Monetarism and Macroeconomic Policy
- Truth versus Precision in Economics
- Doing Economic Research
- Monetary Policy and the Great Inflation in the United States
