= Leslie Brent =

British immunologist and zoologist (1925–2019)

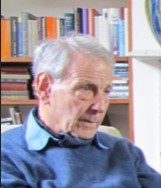
Leslie Baruch Brent, London 2012

Leslie Baruch Brent MBE MEASA (5 July 1925 – 21 December 2019) was a British immunologist and zoologist. He was Professor Emeritus, University of London, from 1990. An immunologist, he was the co-discoverer, with Peter Medawar and Rupert Billingham, of acquired immunological tolerance. They injected cells from donor mice into fetal mice, and later neonatal mice, which would as adults receive donor skin grafts without rejection.

Brent was born Lothar Baruch, in Köslin, Germany (now Koszalin, Poland), to German Jewish parents, Charlotte (Rosenthal) and Arthur Baruch. To avoid persecution in the largely non-Jewish Köslin, his family placed him in the Jewish Orphanage Berlin-Pankow in Berlin in 1936. In 1938, at age 13, to escape the rising anti-Semitism of the Sturmabteilung (Storm Troopers) and teachers, Brent was sent to England on the first of the Kindertransports and became a pupil at Anna Essinger's Bunce Court School. His parents and older sister stayed behind in Germany. Because his status as a German national would have made him liable to execution in the event of capture, he was advised to change his name. After the war, he found out that his parents were sent to Riga, Latvia, and executed. There are three stolpersteine for his parents and sister in Berlin. After the war, he became a British citizen and enrolled at University of Birmingham where he was president of the Guild of Undergraduates in 1950–1951. He received his Ph.D. at University College London.

As a secular Jew who escaped the Holocaust, Brent was highly critical of Israel's treatment of the Palestinians.

In 2012 he was interviewed and filmed for the documentary The Essential Link: The Story of Wilfrid Israel by Yonatan Nir, in which he talked about his Kindertransport experience.

He was a member of the European Academy of Sciences and Arts and an honorary member of the British Society for Immunology.

Brent died in December 2019, at the age of 94. He was posthumously appointed Member of the Order of the British Empire (MBE) in the 2020 New Year Honours for services to Holocaust education.

== Career ==
- Laboratory technician, 1941–43
- Army service, 1943–47, Captain
- Lecturer, Department of Zoology, UCL, 1954–1962
- Rockefeller Research Fellow, California Institute of Technology, 1956–57
- Research scientist, National Institute for Medical Research, 1962–65
- Professor of Zoology, University of Southampton, 1965–69
- Professor of Immunology, St. Mary's Hospital Medical School, London, 1969–1990

== Other positions ==
- European Editor, Transplantation, 1963–68
- Chairman: Wessex Branch, Institute of Biology, 1966–68
- General Secretary, British Transplantation Society, 1971–75
- President, The Transplantation Society, 1976–78
