= Richard Sonnenfeldt =

German language interpreter (1923–2009)

Richard Wolfgang Sonnenfeldt (23 July 1923 Berlin, Germany – 9 October 2009, Port Washington, New York) was a Jewish American engineer and corporate executive most notable for being the U.S. prosecution team's chief interpreter in 1945 prior to the Nuremberg Trial after World War II.

== Life ==
Richard was born Heinz Wolfgang Richard Sonnenfelt in 1923 to Jewish parents, Walther and Gertrud (Liebenthal) Sonnenfeldt, in Gardelegen. He was eventually driven from his homeland by the harshness of the Nuremberg Laws. In 1938, his mother was able to deliver Richard and his brother Helmut to Bunce Court, a boarding school in England. After Germany attacked England in 1940, he was interned in England as an enemy alien. Sonnenfeldt was sent to a prison in Australia, then released. On arrival in Australia he gave his name as Wolfgang Heinz Israel Sonnenfeldt. He emigrated to India and then the United States, arriving in April 1941 and reunited with his family in Baltimore. (His brother, Helmut, not treated as an enemy alien because he was under age 16, obtained passage from England to the U.S. Their parents escaped from Germany to Sweden and made it from there to the U.S.)

In the U.S., Sonnenfeldt finished high school, was drafted into the U.S. Army, and became a U.S. citizen. He was then sent back to Europe as a U.S. soldier. In 1945 following the Battle of the Bulge, he was in combat action. In April 1945, he briefly entered the liberated Dachau concentration camp in Germany and saw many dead bodies and near-dead survivors. After Germany's surrender, he was working in an Army motor pool in Austria when General William J. ("Wild Bill") Donovan, head of the Office of Strategic Services (OSS), recruited Sonnenfeldt to be his personal interpreter because he spoke both German and English fluently. Donovan soon became the first deputy of U.S. Supreme Court Justice Robert H. Jackson, who had been appointed by President Truman to serve as U.S. Chief of Counsel for the prosecution of Nazi war criminals. Sonnenfeldt moved with Donovan into that project, first to Paris and then to Nuremberg.

In 1946, Sonnenfeldt left Nuremberg and the Army and returned to the United States. He studied electrical engineering at Johns Hopkins University in Baltimore, graduating first in his class. In his subsequent careers, he was part of the Radio Corporation of America (RCA) team that invented color television, involved in work for NASA on the Moon landings, a senior executive at the National Broadcasting Company (NBC), the dean of a business school, and inventor and holder of many patents, among other things.

Sonnenfeldt's memoirs, first published in Germany, were published in English in 2006 as Witness to Nuremberg (Arcade Publishing). Sonnenfeldt was interviewed for the 2006 BBC docudrama Nuremberg: Nazis on Trial and many other documentaries.

Richard Sonnenfeldt died on October 9, 2009, from complications of a stroke at his home in Port Washington, New York, at the age of 86.

== Books ==
- ISBN 978-1-55970-856-2 (Witness to Nuremberg) by Richard W. Sonnenfeldt
