= Otterden =

Village in Kent, England

Coordinates: 51.245°N 0.79°E

- Location within Kent
- Population: 162 (2011 Census)
- District: Maidstone
- Shire county: Kent
- Region: South East
- Country: England
- Sovereign state: United Kingdom
- Post town: Faversham
- Postcode district: ME13
- Police: Kent
- Fire: Kent
- Ambulance: South East Coast
- UK Parliament: Faversham and Mid Kent

Otterden is a civil parish and village on the Kent Downs in the borough of Maidstone in Kent, England.

== History ==
Otterden is mentioned in the Domesday Book under Kent in the lands belonging to Adam FitzHubert. The book which was written in 1086 said:

The same Adam holds Otterden of the bishop. It is assessed as half a sulong There is land for two ploughs and two villans with four bordars having half a plough. There\are two slaves and one acre of meadow and woodland for 5 pigs. TRE and aftgerwards worth about ten shillings now 30. To this manor belong two messuages in Canterbury giving 12 pence. Alweard had this manor from King Edward.

Otterden has an important place in the history of science: Stephen Gray and Granville Wheler carried out their seminal experiments showing that electricity can be conducted over long distances at Wheler's estate there in 1729.

From 1933 to 1940 and from 1946 to 1948, Otterden was the home of the Bunce Court School, founded by Anna Essinger when she closed her German boarding school after the Nazi Party seized power and moved her school to England.

== See also ==
- Listed buildings in Otterden
