= Blaustein =

- Municipality
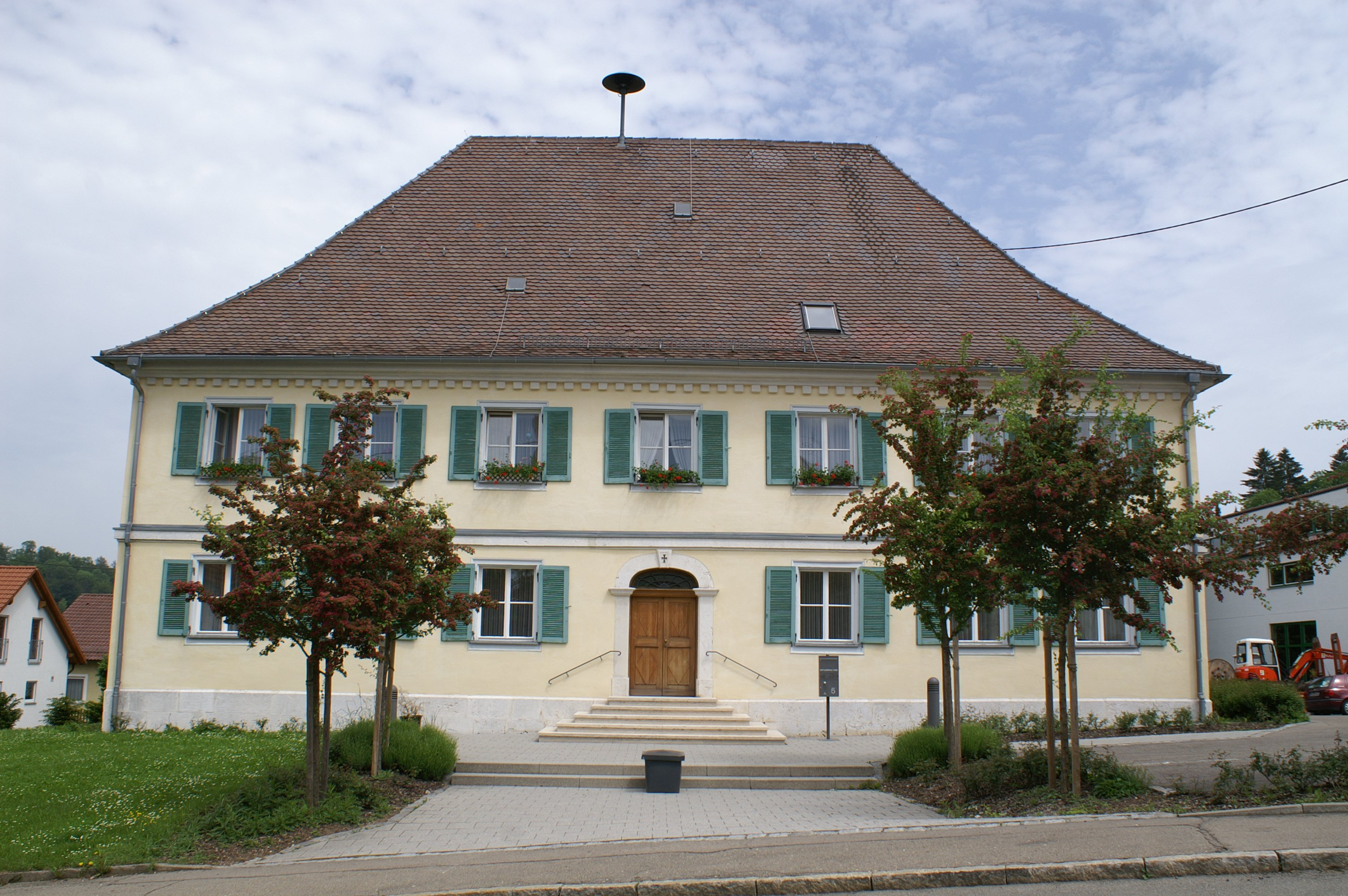
- Town hall in Arnegg

- Coat of arms

- Location of Blaustein within Alb-Donau-Kreis district
- Interactive map of Blaustein
- Location within Germany Location within Baden-Württemberg
- Coordinates: 48°25′6″N 9°54′29″E
- Country: Germany
- State: Baden-Württemberg
- Admin. region: Tübingen
- District: Alb-Donau-Kreis

Government
  - Mayor (2023–31): Konrad Peter Menz (CDU)

Area
  - Total: 55.61 km^{2} (21.47 sq mi)
- Elevation: 495 m (1,624 ft)

Population (2025-12-31)
  - Total: 16,630
  - Density: 299.0/km^{2} (774.5/sq mi)
- Time zone: UTC+01:00 (CET)
  - Summer (DST): UTC+02:00 (CEST)
- Postal codes: 89134
- Dialling codes: 07304, 0731
- Vehicle registration: UL
- Website: www.blaustein.de

Blaustein (German pronunciation: [ˈblaʊʃtaɪn]) is a town in the district of Alb-Donau Baden-Württemberg in Germany. It is situated on the Blau River, 6 km west of Ulm and has about 15,000 inhabitants.

Before 1968, Blaustein was known as Herrlingen. It was created in 1968 after the union of Ehrenstein and Klingenstein. During the 1970s, the municipalities of Arnegg, Bermaringen, Dietingen, Herrlingen, Lautern, Markbronn, Weidach and Wippingen became part of the new municipality of Blaustein. Herrlingen was the home of German Jewish educator Anna Essinger's boarding school, Landschulheim Herrlingen, founded in 1926. In 1933, with the rise of Nazism, Essinger moved the school and, with their parents' permission, the school's 66 Jewish pupils to safety in England.

== Geography ==
=== Geographical location ===
Blaustein is west from Ulm, nestled between Hochsträß, Blautal, Lautertal and the plateau of the Swabian Jura. The town lies at an altitude of 490–690 meters. The rivers Blau and Lauter – which arises in Blaustein (Lautern) – flow through the city.

=== Neighboring communities ===
Blaustein is bordered on the northeast by Dornstadt, on the southeast by the town of Ulm, on the west by the town of Blaubeuren and on the northwest by Berghülen.

=== Municipality arrangement ===
The city Blaustein consists of 10 districts: Arnegg, Bermaringen, Dietingen, Ehrenstein, Herrlingen, Klingenstein, Lautern, Markbronn, Weidach and Wippingen.

== History ==
Blaustein has been inhabited since the Neolithic period. There was a Neolithic temporal village near Ehrenstein. This was included in 2011 to the UNESCO World Heritage Site. However, the municipality and later town Blaustein arose only on 1 September 1968 with the merger of the municipalities Ehrenstein and Klingenstein. Before 1968, the city was known as Herrlingen. In the course of the municipal reform in this period, Markbronn-Dietingen was incorporated to Arnegg initially on 1 July 1971. On 1 October 1974, the incorporation of Bermaringen and Wippingen to Blaustein took place. The community Blaustein received on 1 January 1975, the current form by the association of the municipalities Arnegg, Blaustein and Herrlingen.

On 1 October 2014, Blaustein became a town.

=== Erwin Rommel ===
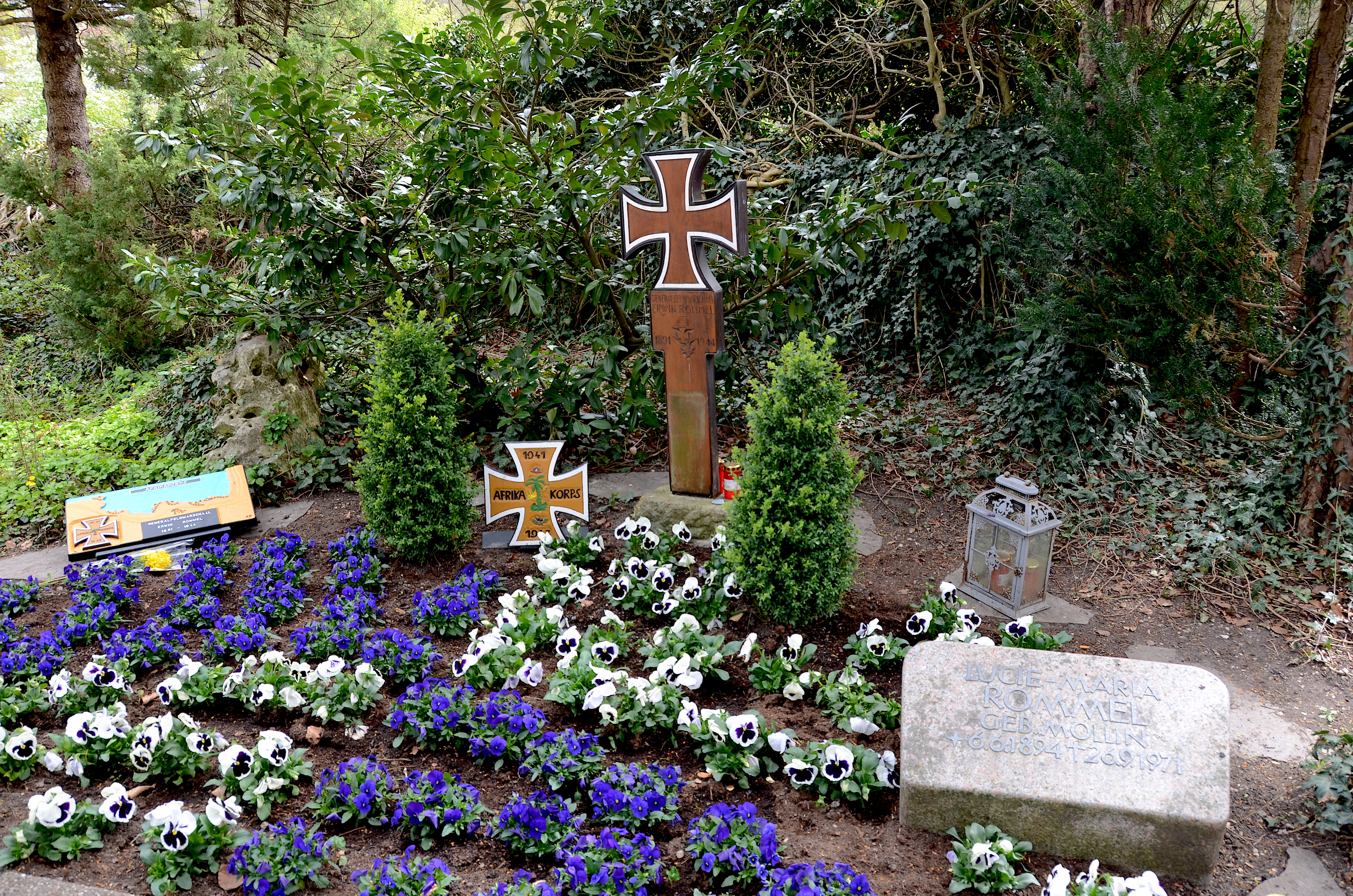
Tomb of Erwin Rommel in Herrlingen (2019)

Herrlingen is also the final resting place of Field Marshal Erwin Rommel. Erwin Rommel was inter alia the Commander of the Afrika Korps and was competent for the defense of the Atlantic Wall Army Group B. He lived from mid-1943 with his family in the district Herrlingen (then Wippinger Steige, today: Erwin-Rommel-Steige; the house originally belonged to the complex of the Jewish Landschulheim). After being seriously wounded, he was picked up on October 14, 1944 during a recovery leave by the generals Ernst Maisel and Wilhelm Burgdorf. They forced him to sit in their car, then they drove to a place between Herrlingen and Wippingen. There Rommel had to commit suicide by taking potassium cyanide. The former "Favorite General of the leader" had fallen in disgrace with Hitler because he had held critical talks about the situation on the Western Front. He was also suspected to be involved in the attempt on Hitler on the 20 July plot. There is a memorial stone on the spot, where he committed suicide. Rommel's ashes are buried in the cemetery Herrlingen. A museum was established some time ago in the Herrlingen Lindenhof Villa. Manfred Rommel, son of Erwin Rommel, and later Lord Mayor of Stuttgart (1974–1996) lived during his youth in this house.

== Districts ==
=== Arnegg ===
The place was first mentioned in 1292. After changing several local lordships, the further development was determined since 1700 by the Teutonic Order Altshausen.

Today the 17th century tithe barn can be seen, the 1737-built Marienkirche and the 1783-built official house that still is used as the town hall.

=== Bermaringen ===
Around 750, the Alemanni settled in the area. The village was first mentioned in documents in 1225.

=== Ehrenstein ===
From the lion rock (Löwenfelsem) are findings of the early bronze age. In 1983 the old school house/town hall was demolished and replaced by modern office and residential buildings.

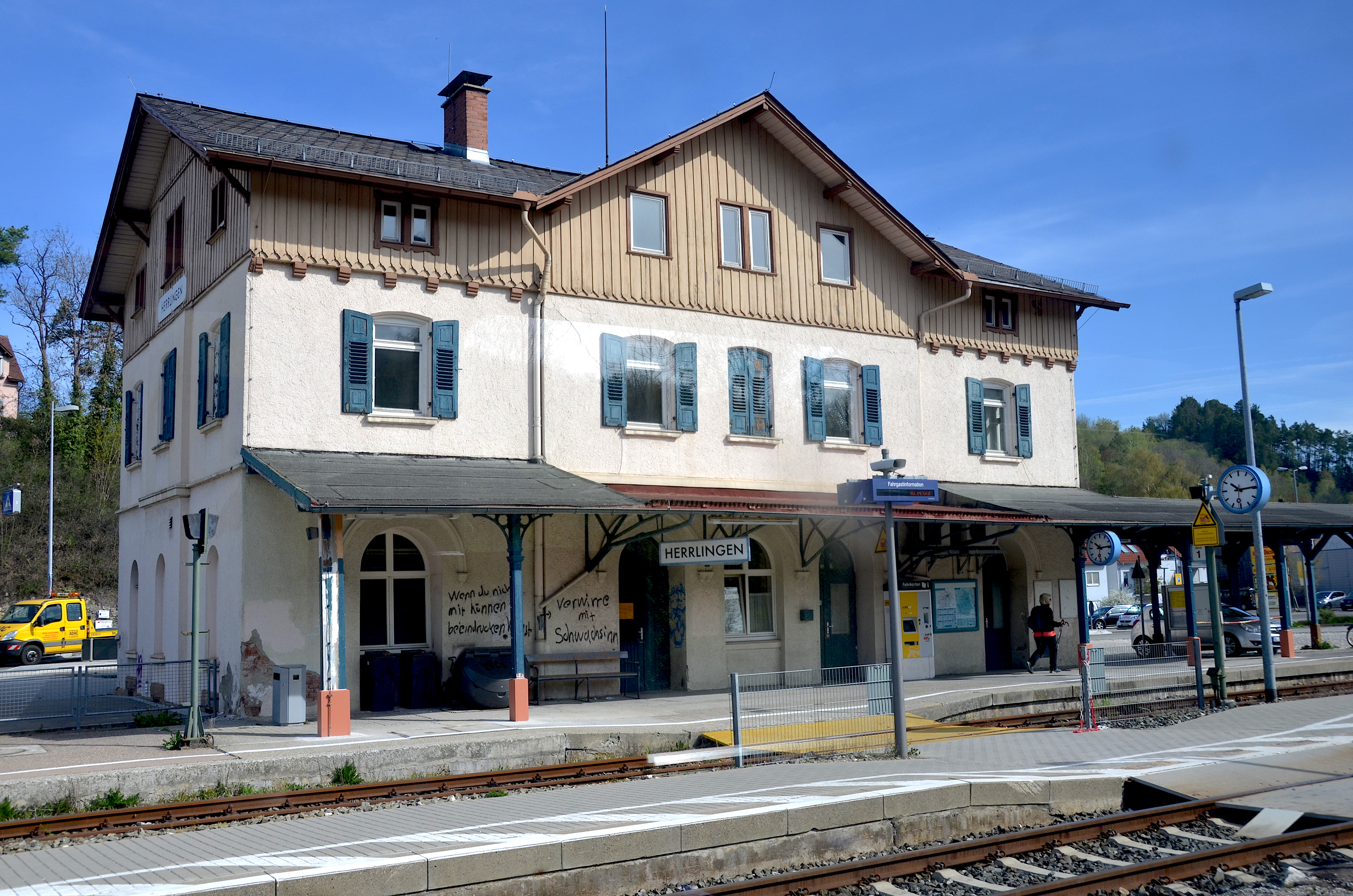
Railway station Herrlingen 2019

=== Herrlingen ===
Herrlingen has its own Railway station. Field Marshal Erwin Rommel is buried in Herrlingen.

=== Klingenstein ===
The district Klingenstein is considerably marked through the palace Klingenstein and the surrounding ruins of the castle Klingenstein. The castle was first mentioned in 1215. It belonged to the families of Stain / Klingenstein. Palace and ruins went in 1860 to the property of the Ulm pharmacist and inventor family Leube. It is now owned by the Leube Foundation. The 1931 Protestant Kreuzkirche is next to the nearby Church of St. Joseph one of the few expressionist church buildings in Baden-Württemberg.

=== Weidach ===
Weidach has two Catholic churches. St. Wendelin has a small bell tower, the church of Nicholas of Flue has no bell tower.

=== Wippingen ===
Wippingen was documented for the first time in 1085. The place burned down almost completely in 1611. See also: Castle Lauterstein (de).

== World Heritage Site ==
Blaustein is home to one or more prehistoric pile-dwelling (or stilt house) settlements that are part of the Prehistoric Pile dwellings around the Alps UNESCO World Heritage Site.

== Notable residents ==
- Lucy Christalnigg (1872–1914), racing driver and one of the first female drivers in the Austrian-Hungarian Empire
- Wolfgang Fahrian (born 1941 in the Klingenstein district), football player and goalkeeper of the Germany national football team at the Football World Cup 1962
- Dieter Baumann (born 1965), former athlete and Olympic athlete
- Lucca Staiger (born 1988), national basketball player
