= Timeline of music in the United States (1950–1969) =

Timeline of music in the United States
To 1819; 1820–1849; 1850–1879; 1880–1919	1920–1949; 1950–1969; 1970–2000; 2001–present
Music history of the United States
Colonial era – to the Civil War – During the Civil War – Late 19th century – 1900–1940 – 1950s – 1960s – 1970s – 1980s

This is a timeline of music in the United States from 1950 to 1969.

== 1950 ==
- The Fender Esquire guitar is released; it is the first "mass-produced, solid body electric guitar".
- The recent success of "Tennessee Waltz", a "folk" or country song, a number of cover versions are released, including Jimmy Mitchell's, arranged for jazz band by Erskine Hawkins, and Patti Page, whose version is "pathbreaking" as Page sings "four-piece harmony with herself, creating a delicate latticework of sound... simultaneously direct and ethereal, plain yet highly ornamented, with an aura of childlike magic".
- Ahmet Ertegun and Herb Abramson's Atlantic Records has its first major hit with Ruth Brown's "Teardrops from My Eyes".
- Pete Seeger and The Weavers release a cover of Lead Belly's "Goodnight Irene", inspiring a brief fad for pop-folk music based around a "bright, homey, simple, folksy melody sort of tune" that tamed the rough sounds of American folk music for mainstream tastes.
- North Korea invades South Korea, instigating the Korean War and delaying the U.S. Army's intention to implement a program to train military bands.
- Seeburg introduces the first 45 rpm jukebox.

Early 1950s music trends
- Composer John Cage leads a group of New York musicians in the Project for Music for Magnetic Tape, along with Christian Wolff, Earle Brown, Morton Feldman and David Tudor.
- The Modern Jazz Quartet, led by John Lewis, begins performing, intending to expand the "audience for modern jazz... (and) provide music that could be listened to attentively in a concert hall".
- The rise of anti-Communist hysteria, McCarthyism, leads to a decline in popularity for American folk music, Russian-American balalaika orchestras and other fields of music.
- Nashville, Tennessee becomes the national center for country music, helped in large part by the popular radio show, Grand Ole Opry.
- D. T. Suzuki, a Japanese author, lectures at Columbia University. Among the intendees is John Cage, whose "musical thought was entirely transformed by this encounter"; Cage's technique becomes central in the development of modern art music, and is in part inspired by Suzuki and Zen Buddhism.
- Mambo becomes a major craze in the United States, led by Perez Prado, the "most widely acclaimed bandleader" of the era.
- Chinese American intellectuals, unable to return to China after the formation of the People's Republic, spur the development of American Peking opera and instrumental theater traditions.
- Greenwich Village begins to become a major center for music, especially the folk music revival and bluegrass.
- B. B. King and Bobby "Blue" Bland add elements of gospel and jazz to the traditional sound of blues.

- Sing Out!, a magazine for folk music aficionados, is first published.
- Elektra, a record label, opens in New York City; it will eventually become one of the major labels of the folk music revival.
- Mahalia Jackson becomes the first to perform gospel music at Carnegie Hall.
- The 45rpm single is introduced.
- Irving Berlin's Call Me Madam uses a song, "They Like Ike", that inspires Dwight Eisenhower's presidential campaign slogan, "I Like Ike".
- A Chicago-based group, including Lennie Tristano and Lee Konitz, make series of groundbreaking records that offer the "most advanced harmonic and contrapuntal sounds employed in jazz to that date".
- Douglas Moore's Pulitzer Prize-winning tragic opera Giants in the Earth is the "effective beginning of realism in American opera".
- Joe Bostic organizes the first of a series of Negro Gospel and Religious Music Festivals, which will become an overwhelming success and the "first big all-gospel concert in history".
- Muddy Waters "Louisiana Blues" is a popular song that brings a new, more intense and exciting form of Chicago blues, characterized by the use of the electric guitar.
- Radio Free Europe begins broadcasting in Czechoslovakia.
- Sam Phillips founds the Memphis Recording Service, the first permanent studio in Memphis. He will record many important R&B, blues and country performers there, including Jackie Brenston, Howlin' Wolf and B. B. King.
- Word Records is founded. It will soon become the biggest company in the Christian music and gospel sectors of the industry.

== 1951 ==
- Rodgers and Hammerstein's The King and I is a very popular musical, inaugurating one of the "most illustrious decades" in the history of the Broadway musical.
- Disc jockey Alan Freed learns from Cleveland record store owner Leo Mintz that white youths were becoming interested in African-American music, and starts The Moondog Show in response, becoming the first white disc jockey to play rhythm and blues for mostly white listeners.
- Pee Wee King's "Tennessee Waltz" becomes a national hit for Patti Page; though the recording is perceived as "country music", it shows "little of the character of traditional country music" and features "Page singing a sweet-sounding overdubbed duet with herself in a voice and diction essentially free of regional traits".
- Fender begins producing electric bass guitars, the first model being the Fender Precision Bass.
- Todd Storz and Bill Stewart begin the Top 40 radio format at KOWH in Omaha, Nebraska, inspired by the jukebox. This development would be seen by some observers and critics as a "recipe for cowardice, bringing to popular music one of the most insidious trends in postwar American society, the deployment of market research to create a placid emporium in which consumers are given the dubious satisfaction of never finding, or fulfilling, a fresh or disturbing desire". The Top 40 format also heralded a change in popular music by reinforcing the "popular taste", leading to the development of melodies into riffs, riffs into jingles and jingles into hooks, "instantly recognizable sound patterns... designed to snare a listener's attention". The Top 40 format also sped up the "circulation of songs (generating) a kind of 'dynamic obsolescence' that bred a restless quest for sheer novelty".
- The first wave of the American folk revival falls apart after the publication of Red Channels: Communist Influence on Radio and Television, which prominently mentioned folk band The Weavers.
- Miriam Rappaport forms the Jewish Folk Lab in New York, an important venue for the revival of interest in
- Influential gospel label Nashboro Records is founded.
- Jackie Brenston & His Delta Cats' "Rocket 88" and Johnnie Ray's "Cry" are both sometimes considered the first rock and roll songs.
- One of the most prominent female and black composers of the era, Julia Perry, achieves renown with her Stabat Mater for contralto and string orchestra.
- The Clovers' "Don't You Know I Love You" is the first in a string of hits created under the guidance of Jesse Stone, who innovated what became known as the "Atlantic sound" in rhythm and blues.
- The first Peking opera club, Chinese Opera Club in America, in the United States is founded in New York City, by Chinese students stranded there.
- Ballet dancer Janet Collins becomes the first African-American artist to appear onstage at the Metropolitan Opera, in a production of Aida.
- William Warfield and Muriel Rahn become the first African-American concert artists to appear on The Ed Sullivan Show.
- Vladimir Ussachevsky finishes the first compositions by an American of musique concrète.
- The RCA Electronic Music Synthesizer, created by Herbert Belar and Harry F. Olson, is created, though it will not be complete until the following year. It is the first musical synthesizer.

== 1952 ==
- Otto Luening and Vladimir Ussachevsky of Columbia University present the "first American tape-music concert at the Museum of Modern Art in New York".
- The first North American charanga is the Orquesta Gilberto Valdés, in New York.
- The Institute of Jazz Studies at Rutgers University is among the first library of jazz materials, and will soon be the world's most comprehensive.
- John Cage becomes the "first American to complete a tape composition", Imaginary Landscape No. 5, and also publishes Williams Mix, an influential piece of less than five minutes in length, produced by categorizing sounds in a process that bypassed personal preference in their ordering, as well as 4′33″, which consisted entirely of silence with the intention of focusing the audience's attention on ambient sounds.
- Kitty Wells' "It Wasn't God Who Made Honky Tonk Angels", an answer song to Hank Thompson's "The Wild Side of Life", is the beginning of the era of female country stars. It "showed that a song from a women's point of view could become a best-seller".
- Cleveland-area radio personality Alan Freed hosts the Moondog Coronation Ball, a rock concert that ended in a riot after running out of room for ticket-holding fans; the crowd was estimated at between 6,000 and 25,000 black teenagers.
- Jerry Leiber and Mike Stoller's "Kansas City", recorded by Little Willie Littlefield is a pioneering melodic pop blues song that later become hits for Wilbert Harrison, Little Richard and The Beatles. The song helped launch the careers of Leiber and Stoller, who would become two of the most prominent songwriters in the field.
- Harry Everett Smith, working for Moses Asch and Folkways Records, releases the Anthology of American Folk Music, a pivotal collection in the popularization of American folk music and the development of a roots revival. It inspires urban Northerners to seek out the music of rural Southerners.
- Under the leadership of Frederick Fennell, the University of Rochester's Eastman School of Music establishes the first wind ensemble based at an institution of higher education.
- Though short-lived, the Orquesta Gilberto Valdés is the first charanga, a Cuban band format, in North America.
- Irish immigration, which had surged following World War II, increases again after the passage of the Immigration and Nationality Act, which favors immigrants from Ireland. The new Irish community increases the demand for popular Irish-styled music, and spurs the development of the Irish dance and music culture centered in Dudley Street, Boston.
- The Ukrainian Music Institute is founded in New York, to promote traditional Ukrainian music.
- The last film studios switch to using 35 mm tape, allowing "music to be recorded more quickly and easily than ever before; music tracks had greater fidelity and less background noise, and could be cut and edited with unprecedented ease and precision".
- The first professional full-time group specializing in early music performance is the Pro Musica Antiqua, founded by Bernard Krainis and Noah Greenberg. The group will later be known as New York Pro Musica.
- Johnnie Ray's "Cry" is the first song by a white rhythm and blues singer to top both the pop and R&B charts.
- Both the National Catholic Bandmasters Association and American School Band Directors Association are founded.
- The Gibson Les Paul, a popular and early solid body electric guitar, is introduced.
- Vladimir Ussachevsky and Otto Luening present the first public concert of electroacoustic music at the Museum of Modern Art in New York City.
- Elliott Wexler of Philadelphia becomes the first rack jobber of recorded discs, a person who rents retail space to stock product, and replenishes the product as needed. This practice is used in places like gas stations that do not typically stock discs, but may do so in some circumstances.

== 1953 ==
- Alan Freed launches a show called The Biggest Rhythm and Blues Show, a package tour that included Ruth Brown and Wynonie Harris. The show would become the "largest-grossing R&B revue up to that time".
- Elvis Presley records his first songs, "My Happiness" and "That's When Your Heartaches Begin". These records would introduce Presley to Sam Phillips, who worked for Sun Records.
- Pete Seeger and Harry Belafonte see a show featuring a performer who goes by the sole name of Odetta; the African-American singer and guitarist becomes one of the stars of the American folk revival, helped in part by her race, which "bestowed an air of credibility on her music" for some folk audiences, because her style reflected that field's strong inspiration in rural African-American music.
- The Dixie Hummingbirds' "Let's Go Out to the Programs" becomes a major hit, their signature song and a classic piece of gospel.
- The Music Educators National Conference launches a periodical devoted to the study of music education, entitled Journal of Research in Music Education.
- Alarmed by the Soviet Union sending cultural figures abroad, the American government creates the United States Information Agency to coordinate cultural activities internationally.
- George Russell becomes well known within the jazz community with the publication of Lydian Concept of Total Organization, which offers a "complex system of associating chords with scales organized by their degree of consonance or dissonance".
- The Spaniels' "Baby, It's You" popularizes the use of nonsense syllables like doo-doo-doo-wop to "add rhythmic accompaniment to romantic songs", imitating the use of the string bass in other rhythm and blues groups; this technique becomes a central part of black vocal harmony groups.
- The first pan-North American Estonian song festival for male choruses is held in Toronto, Ontario, Canada, and will alternate between there and the United States, usually New York; a similar gathering for female choruses begins the following year.
- Benny Goodman embarks on a famously disastrous tour with Louis Armstrong's All Stars. Goodman insults Armstrong, an elder statesman of jazz, and Goodman himself is perturbed at the more vaudevillean elements of Armstrong's show. Goodman has a nervous breakdown, and retires from popular music.
- A score by Alfred Newman for the film The Robe is the first to be released in true stereo sound.
- The Prisonaires, a vocal group based in the Tennessee State Penitentiary, have a hit with "Just Walkin' in the Rain". The song establishes Sun Records.
- Radio Liberty begins broadcasting to Russia.
- The Red Tops, led by Walter Osborne and based out of Vicksburg, Mississippi, begins performing locally, soon becoming one of the most popular blues bands of the mid-South until 1973.

== 1954 ==
- Elvis Presley records "That's All Right (Mama)" and "Blue Moon of Kentucky", both breakthrough recordings that launched his career and helped bring African-American musical techniques to white audiences.
- Jazz musician Miles Davis discovers an "intensely personal sound that was often heard in tightly muted playing, close to the microphone", a trend exemplified by a recording of the blues number "Walkin' with J. J. Johnson, Horace Silver and Kenny Clarke.
- The Fender Stratocaster, the first electric guitar with three pickups, is introduced by the Fender Electric Instrument Company. It will play a major role in the popularization of rock and roll.
- The first published bibliography on a specific genre of popular music is Alan Merriam's A Bibliography of Jazz.
- The Newport Jazz Festival is founded in Newport, Rhode Island, reflecting a growing acceptance for jazz as an art.
- Fender introduces the Stratocaster model of guitar, the first model that came to be viewed as a fashion statement in addition to a musical instrument.
- The Chords "Sh-Boom" and a subsequent pop cover by The Crew-Cuts help "launch an American fad for amateur black harmony groups" that came to be known as doo wop. By the end of the year, The Penguins' "Earth Angel" established the long-term popularity of doo wop. "Sh-Boom" has also been called the first rock and roll recording.
- WDIA, an influential and well-studied radio station in Memphis drastically boosts its broadcasting area, helping the group Spirit of Memphis.
- For the first time, a number of African-American performers achieve the Billboard pop charts in the same year: Hank Ballard & The Midnighters' "Work with Me, Annie", The Crows' "Gee", The Chords' "Sh-Boom" and Clyde McPhatter and The Drifters' "Honey Love". "Sh-Boom" also becomes a hit for a cover band, The Crew Cuts.
- Bruno Nettl conducts research showing that the "rise", or the inclusion of new or repetitive melodic material at a higher pitch than the opening, is a distinctive feature of all Native American music of California.
- The Moonglows innovate a new technique in the field of black vocal harmony with their single "Sincerely", in which the singers blow nonsense sounds in the microphone to create a vocal effect.
- Little Richard and his drummer, Charles Connor, introduce a new rhythm to the field of black popular music in imitation of a train; the beat will be adopted by many rhythm and blues, rock and roll and doo wop groups.
- Fandango begins broadcasting on KNXT in California, the first TV show to target Mexican-American audiences with Spanish language musical performances.
- Lionel "Chica" Sesma moves the popular Latin Holidays, a ballroom dance-oriented party, to the Hollywood Palladium, where the dances will become an integral part of the Mexican-Californian music scene.
- Mahalia Jackson becomes the first gospel performer with her own television show, the Mahalia Jackson Show, on CBS.
- Alex Bradford organizes the first all-male gospel choir.

== 1955 ==
Mid-1950s music trends
- Bluegrass music begins moving outside of country audiences to mainstream listeners, including Mike Seeger and Ralph Rinzler, both of whom would go on to play a major role in bluegrass history.
- The black urban popular music rhythm and blues inspires the white teenage popular music rock and roll.
- A number of jazz musicians, including pianist Horace Silver, move towards a style known as funk, characterized by the subordination of "melody and harmony to the rhythmic groove".
- The term bluegrass comes to describe a kind of country-based music, popular especially in rural areas and among those in the urban revival of American folk music.
- Rockabilly is the most popular form of country music.
- The Clara Ward Singers begin their period of greatest success with a series of records released by Savoy.
- Church groups and others begin to denounce rock and roll, "connecting it in an unholy alliance to race, sex and delinquency".
- Isidro López' band achieves unprecedented commercial success and changes the Tejano big band into a more distinctive and smaller format, influenced strongly by the corrido.

- Ali Akbar Khan becomes the first Indian musician to perform on American television, on Alistair Cooke's Omnibus.
- Teenagers enter the mainstream pop music market in greater numbers, leading to the Billboard Top 100 measuring the "preferences of a younger, more specialized segment of the population that it had before".
- Bill Haley & His Comets' "Rock Around the Clock" (recorded on April 12, 1954) is a pioneering release that tops both the popular and rhythm and blues music charts. It is rereleased this year (after its initial release the year before) with a controversial film about teenage rebellion and violence called Blackboard Jungle. The song will make Haley into the first major white rock and roll star. The film is the first to link popular music with the generation gap and adolescent rebellion.
- Fats Domino's "Ain't It a Shame", a recording which made him a "prototypical rock and roll star—and well on his way to becoming an iconic figure of American popular music."
- Chuck Berry records "Maybellene" with Jerome Green and Willie Dixon. This song, along with Bo Diddley's "Bo Diddley" and "Pretty Thing", popularize the use of the guitar as the "focal instrument" of rhythm and blues.
- Little Richard records "Tutti Frutti". The song becomes a surprise hit that helped inspire such pioneers as Otis Redding, James Brown and Paul McCartney.
- Frankie Lymon & the Teenagers record "Why Do Fools Fall in Love", a popular doo wop hit.
- Elvis Presley's "I Forgot to Remember to Forget" is a major hit that establishes Presley as a country star. Presley leaves Sam Phillips and goes to RCA Records, Hill & Range publishers and Colonel Tom Parker and manager. Phillips convinces Carl Perkins to move from country and western to a more rhythm and blues-influenced style, resulting in the recording of "Blue Suede Shoes", which becomes a hit in the following year.
- Ozark Jubilee begins a 5 1/2-year run on ABC-TV as the first network TV program to showcase country music stars.
- Harry Belafonte begins a brief fad for pop music based on calypso, a style of Trinidadian music. His biggest hits are "Jamaican Farewell" and "Banana Boat (Day-O)". The success of calypso helps legitimate the popular songs of the American roots revival.
- The Weavers return to performing, with a show at Carnegie Hall, after years of being blacklisted for alleged ties to Communism.
- Critically beloved opera singer Marian Anderson becomes the first African American allowed to perform at the Metropolitan Opera for the first time.
- Leonard Roseman's score for Rebel Without a Cause and Elmer Bernstein's for The Man With the Golden Arm are influential jazz-tinged film compositions.
- Mahalia Jackson and the Drinkard Singers are the first gospel performers to appear at the Newport Folk Festival.
- James Howard becomes the first scholar to publish extensive research on the pantribal powwow.
- Gilbert Chase's America's Music, from the Pilgrims to the Present is published; it becomes one of the most acclaimed works of American music history, and was the first major work to evaluate American music on its own terms rather than from a European perspective.
- Perez Prado records "Cherry Pink and Apple Blossom White", which became the best-selling record worldwide this year, and launches the American chachacha craze.
- The Cobweb, a film scored by Leonard Rosenman, is the "first Hollywood score to employ 12-tone technique."
- Lejaren A. Hiller and Leonard M. Isaacson produce the first "computer-generated (music) composition", the Illiac Suite.
- Marian Anderson becomes the first African-American singer to perform with the Metropolitan Opera Company, in Giuseppe Verdi's Un ballo in maschera. A few weeks later, baritone Robert McFerrin becomes the first black male to do so.
- Norman Granz produces the Jazz at the Philharmonic project at the Music Hall in Houston, Texas. This is a controversial show that is a jazz milestone, giving "first-class treatment to jazz musicians for the first time".
- Leontyne Price becomes the first African-American singer to perform in an opera on television, in Tosca by Puccini.
- Horace Silver's The Preacher is an influential early fusion of bop and gospel music.
- Leonard Feather's Encyclopedia of Jazz is the first major popular music encyclopedia to be published.
- Congress passes a law banning the practice of payola, offering inducements to disc jockeys and executives to promote particular recordings.
- Seth Loving invents the humbucking pickup for the electric guitar. This eliminates much of the instrument's noisy interference and reduces its response to high frequencies.
- Approximate: Tally Recording Studio is founded in Bakersfield, California, becoming the first major studio of the Bakersfield sound.

== 1956 ==
- The Wizard of Oz is first shown on television, beginning its transformation into an iconic symbol of American culture.
- Elvis Presley first performs on network television, on CBS's Stage Show, making him the "hottest act in show business" at the time. His hit "Heartbreak Hotel" becomes "the prototype for a new genre of morbidly self-pitying rock songs". He also appears on The Ed Sullivan Show, but is taped only from the waist up because his hip movements are seen as too risqué for American audiences. Later in the year, after a performance of "Hound Dog" on The Milton Berle Show in which he grabs his crotch and gyrates his hips in a sexually charged manner, Presley becomes the subject of criticism for what they saw as degenerate moral values. "Hound Dog" would go on to become the biggest selling record of the 1950s, and Presley's performance will play a major role in launching his career.
- Columbia House becomes the first record club in the United States.
- Pat Boone, who had released a string of hit cover versions of African-American popular songs that sold better than the original, releases a cover of Little Richard's "Long Tall Sally". Boone's version is outsold by Little Richard, an event that Keir Keightley called a "symbolic (and) economic triumph of original rock'n'roll over its putatively inferior and commercial copy".
- Forbidden Planet becomes the first movie to have an all-electronic music soundtrack. This was the first widespread exposure to electronic music for ordinary Americans. The soundtrack's composers were the husband and wife team Bebe and Louis Barron.
- My Fair Lady smashes Broadway records, and will run for six years and a total of 2,717 performances.
- Nat King Cole becomes the first "African-American to headline a TV network variety series", The Nat King Cole Show.
- The Clancy Brothers form Tradition, a record label, originally just to record themselves, however, they would go on to record popular folk musicians such as Lightnin' Hopkins and Odetta Hopkins.
- The word bluegrass is first used in print.
- Cover versions of popular songs by African-American artists decline, in large part because the original, African-American recording begins to outsell the covers.
- Members of the Alabama Citizens' Council assault Nat King Cole onstage, leading to massive media attention to the Christian anti-rock and roll movement. Later that year, Louisiana passes a law forbidding interracial social functions, entertainment or dancing of any kind.
- The Navy School of Music takes over all individual advanced training for military musicians.
- The Coasters' "Down in Mexico" is the first in a string of hits by that group, popularizing a style of "teenage-oriented productions,... mainly novelty songs (with) comic lyrics and a playful vocal style accompanied by a rhythm and blues combo".
- "Blue Suede Shoes" by Carl Perkins becomes a massive success and is the "first million-selling triple-play crossover (to move) from the top of the country charts, to those of rhythm & blues, and then pop".
- Dizzy Gillespie's jazz orchestra becomes the first such group to be officially recognized by the U.S. government, when it is chosen to tour as a goodwill ambassador for the State Department.
- The Carl Orff method of music instruction is introduced by Arnold Walter at a Music Educators National Conference in St. Louis.
- The film Rock Around the Clock is the first of many to frame a rock performance as a dramatic account of rock culture. Reports of rioting fuel controversy and help perpetuate the notion that rock is linked to juvenile delinquency. Similar films are released later in the year: Rock, Rock, Rock and The Girl Can't Help It.

== 1957 ==
- Mike Seeger produces an album called American Banjo Scruggs Style, an anthology of bluegrass banjo that "lent new prestige and permanence" to the genre.
- Composer and French horn player Gunther Schuller coins the term third stream, referring to music "that brought jazz techniques into the classical sphere, or vice-versa".
- Pat Suzuki signs to a major label, RCA, the first Japanese American to do so.
- West Side Story by Leonard Bernstein with choreography by Jerome Robbins, a book by Arthur Laurents and lyrics by Stephen Sondheim, opens, reflecting Bernstein's view that American musical theater excelled in a form between opera and light entertainment.
- Tommy Sands' "Teen-Age Crush" is a surprise hit after being used in the television play Singing Idol, loosely based on Elvis Presley. The success of the song inspires Ricky Nelson to begin a musical career that led to pop stardom.
- Stax Records is founded by Jim Stewart in Memphis, originally under the name Satellite Records.
- The television show American Bandstand, which features popular music performers for teen audiences, debuts for national audiences. Within a month, it is reaching "more viewers than any other show on daytime television", and the show's success, along with the popularity of Elvis Presley's movie Jailhouse Rock, is taken as evidence that teenage pop listeners are a viable audience for television programs.
- American Bandstand features Jackie Wilson, one of the show's first African-American performers. His "Reet Petite" is a major hit helps establish both Wilson and producer Berry Gordy.
- Art Laboe, a disc jockey in Los Angeles, is probably the first to use the term oldie to describe former hit records with nostalgic value.
- Israel Young founds New York's Folklore Center, which will become a major part of the American roots revival.
- Jazz performer John Coltrane has a spiritual awakening, quits drugs and begins practicing yoga and studying Eastern religion. He will go on to explore the musics of East and South Asia.
- The Staff Band Officer position is created to monitor military musical activities within their areas.
- Leonard Bernstein and Stephen Sondheim's West Side Story is an influential musical, in that it focused on lower-class life and used "new and exciting rhythms".
- Legendary gospel singer Sam Cooke releases "You Send Me", a secular song that marks the beginning of his transition into a pop singer.
- George Walker becomes the first African American to earn his D.M.A. at the Eastman School of Music.
- Julio Collazo and Francisco Aquabella come to the United States, becoming "catalysts for the development of North American (Santería) ceremonial music making".
- Martin Denny's Exotica is the beginning of the exotica genre, a style of lush music influenced by both Hawaiian and Latin styles.
- Miles Davis and Gil Evans' "Miles Ahead" marks a "significant development in the use of a large orchestra (twenty players) to expand" the band's sound and style, in the field of cool jazz.
- Dick Clark's American Bandstand is picked up by ABC, making a him a national celebrity and the show a cultural phenomenon that helps shape American popular music.
- The Famous Ward Singers are the first gospel group to perform at the Newport Jazz Festival.
- John Lewis, organizer of the Monterey Jazz Festival, opens the "first summer jazz school" in Lenox, Massachusetts.
- The first computer music studio is created by Max V. Mathews in Murray Hill, New Jersey at the Bell Telephone Laboratories.

== 1958 ==
Late 1950s music trends
- Influential composer Milton Babbitt begins experimenting with techniques to produce electronic sound.
- Middle Eastern culture, in particular belly dancing, is featured on a number of popular albums, most of which are only superficially related to the actual musics of the Middle East. Examples include I Remember Lebanon, The Markko Polo Adventurers' Orienta and Music of the Middle East - Port Said featuring Mohammed El-Bakkar.
- Marian Lush introduces the two-trumpet style of polka, which becomes standard in the field.
- Nashville cements its position as a major center for the American popular music industry, aided by the great success of the Bradley Film and Recording Studio.
- Atonal music has developed into "a range of idioms—freely chromatic, twelve-tone, systematically serialized, electronic, chance-based, or combinations thereof—with only atonality in common".
- The Country Music Association is founded.
- Miles Davis records with a band led by Gil Evans, embracing the "restrained musical intensity that (John Lewis and the Modern Jazz Quartet) pioneered.
- The city of Liverpool, England becomes home to a large rock and roll scene, inspired by American rock and rhythm and blues, setting the stage for the British Invasion of the 1960s.
- College students and other young people grow increasingly interested in American folk music, especially blues and what was then known as hillbilly music.
- Helped by the American folk revival and endorsements from Earl Scruggs and Pete Seeger, two of the stars of that field, sales of banjos increase by over 500%. The album-oriented folk revival is, in large part, responsible for doubled LP sales between 1956 and 1961,
- The Hawaiian Renaissance of interest in traditional music and other cultural occurrences begins.
- Max Mathews of Bell Laboratories pioneers the use of computers in creating sound.
- The emotional, gospel-influenced soul blues vocal style, the electric bass and organ are introduced to the popular blues.
- The Irish American music scene comes to be dominated by showband music, wherein bands covered rock songs, especially Elvis Presley, skiffle and other popular styles, including traditionally inspired Irish tunes.
- Chicago-style polka becomes dominant on the East Coast, supplanting the ballroom-style that had been popular since the mid-1930s. People like Marion Lush combine the Chicago and Eastern-styles into a form called dyno-style or push-style.
- Cool jazz musicians begin working on crime shows on television, creating a style sometimes called crime jazz.

- American Bandstand introduces a number of "cleaned-up versions of the coolest new black dances", promoted in "conjunction with upbeat new songs, often specially recorded just for this purpose. Two of the earliest were The Bop, from "At the Hop", and The Stroll, from "The Stroll". The success of American Bandstand and host Dick Clark turned Philadelphia, the show's home, into a "mecca for music men".
- "Lonely Teardrops" by Jackie Wilson is a major hit. Producer Berry Gordy perfected the "formula he would exploit for the next decade, producing an unprecedented series of best-selling records with a variety of different black artists". "Lonely Teardrops"' "upbeat arrangement was designed to exploit one of the latest dance fads... called the cha-lypso, a kind of cha-cha done to a modified calypso beat".
- The second wave of the American folk revival begins, led by the apolitical group the Kingston Trio", and their hit single, "Tom Dooley".
- La Monte Young's Trio for Strings is an early work of experimental West Coast chamber music that began the field of minimalism.
- Gus Palmer Sr. revives the Black Legs Society, or Tonkonga, of the Kiowa, a society that features song, dance and music.
- The Chantels' "Maybe" is the first of many songs from the next few years to cross "over into the mainstream and (establish) the commercial viability of 'girl groups' in the music industry".
- Mantle Hood founds the first gamelan education program in the United States, at the University of California, Los Angeles, with Hardja Susila becoming the first Javanese instructor; Hood will also establish the concept of bi-musicality, in which music students are expected to perform the music they study.
- Rodgers and Hammerstein's Flower Drum Song becomes the first American musical with an Asian-American cast.
- Alvin Ailey's Alvin Ailey American Dance Theater becomes the first African-American resident concert dance company to earn a national reputation.
- The Country Music Association is formed to promote country music in the United States; its predecessor was the Country Music Disk Jockeys Association.
- Gibson introduces the first twin-necked electric guitar, and the Flying V guitar, the first of many with outlandish shapes.
- Stereo records are introduced.
- The Grammy Awards are first instituted to recognize popular performers, as voted on by the United States National Academy of Recording Arts and Sciences. They will become the most prestigious award in popular music. The name Grammies is chosen in a contest, with the winning entry coming from Jay Danna of New Orleans, who wins twelve LPs as a reward.

== 1959 ==
- The Mark II, an advanced electronic synthesizer, is installed in a Columbia University studio by the Radio Corporation of America. This technological advance greatly simplified electronic music-making and recording.
- Bluegrass music gains greatly in audience and acclaim with the release of Mountain Music Bluegrass Style, compiled by Mike Seeger for Folkways, the Folksong '59 concert in Carnegie Hall and an article by Alan Lomax in Esquire.
- Miles Davis' "So What" from Kind of Blue reflects a major innovation, basing "the thirty-two bar structure... not on a chord pattern but an eight-note Dorian, or modal, scale". "Walkin'" was released as a 33-⅓-rpm record, "a format developed for classical music". This is the beginning of modal jazz.
- Berry Gordy forms Motown Records, one the most influential record labels in American popular music and the first African-American-owned label to reach great success in the American pop market.
- Columbia University opens the first "fully-equipped academic electroacoustic music studio" in the country.
- The Lucky Strike Hit Parade, a staple show on both radio and television, is canceled, due to decreased demand for the Hit Parade specialty, "old-fashioned pop singers, who usually lacked the immunity to standards of musical taste essential to carry off a convincing rendition of a typical rock and roll tune".
- Bessie Griffin becomes the first gospel singer to perform in a cabaret, as the lead in Portraits in Broze at New Orleans' Cabaret Concert Theater.
- Jazz on a Summer's Day is one of the most influential, and one of the first, full concert documentary films.
- The payola scandal rocks the American music industry, leading to Congressional inquiry, after the publication of a New York Times article the day after Alan Freed is fired from WABC radio "after refusing to sign a statement that he had never taken money or gifts to promote a record".
- One of the most acclaimed performers of the American folk revival, Joan Baez, begins performing in the Cambridge, Massachusetts coffee house scene.
- Englewood Cliffs Studios is founded in Englewood Cliffs, New Jersey by Rudy Van Gelder. It will be the primary recording studio for much of the soul jazz and hard bop recordings of the 1950s and 60s.
- The New Lost City Ramblers record six albums and an EP for Folkways Records, "initiating a new genre within the (American folk revival) called 'old time'".
- The Drifters are the first of a number of African-American rhythm and blues combos to have hits using the Brazilian baion rhythm (cha cha) with "There Goes My Baby" and "Dance with Me".
- The Cross-Bronx Expressway in New York has profound effects on the area's socioeconomic conditions, escalating the "deterioration of buildings and the displacement of people", an important development that will "profoundly shape the aesthetics and activities" of hip hop culture.
- Fidel Castro comes to power in Cuba, prompting a wave of immigration to Miami and elsewhere, leading to increased prominence for Cuban music.
- Ritchie Valens, the first Latin rock star who had a hit with an English version of a Mexican huapango, "La Bamba", dies in a plane crash with the Big Bopper and Buddy Holly, also both popular rock stars. It will become known as the Day the Music Died.
- The first African Americans initiated into the Santería Afro-Cuban religion, of which music is an integral part, travel to Cuba to do so.
- Johnny Pacheco joins the band of Charlie Palmieri, establishing Pacheco's career; he will go on to become one of the most popular bandleaders and performers in the New York salsa scene.
- The Association of Ukrainian Choirs of America is formed to promote the burgeoning field of both religious and secular Ukrainian American choral singing.
- Dennis Murphy begins working on the construction of gamelan instrumentation, possibly becoming the first American to "build gamelan instruments who meant to model Indonesian ensembles directly".
- By far the most well-known Filipino folkloric dance company, the Bayanihan Philippine Dance Company, tours the United States for the first time, bringing newfound public awareness of Filipino music throughout the country.
- The jazz quartet of Ornette Coleman, Don Cherry, Billy Higgins and Charlie Haden release The Shape of Jazz to Come and Change of the Century, landmark recordings that help establish the field of free jazz.
- One of the first successful white blueswomen, Barbara Dane, becomes the first white woman featured on the cover of Ebony magazine.

== 1960 ==
Early 1960s music trends
- Performers like the New Lost City Ramblers, Joan Baez and Odetta "slowly pushed the (American folk revival) towards a new maturity" by "modernizing their approach and repertoire" with elements of popular music; of these performers, Baez becomes simultaneously one of the most commercially successful and popularly respected, both by folk music purists and more casual audiences, artists of the American folk revival, and makes her record label, Vanguard Records, one of the top labels of the era.
- After years of being intimidated by the anti-Communist McCarthy hearings, balalaika orchestras experience a resurgence; veterans of older orchestras of the same format rejoined the industry, including Mark Selivan, Sergei Larionoff and Luke Bakoota.
- Bluegrass becomes an integral part of the folk revival scene, and many adherents of that movement form bluegrass bands.
- The earliest roots of salsa music begin to emerge.
- Major record labels regain their former market dominance in the field of pop music, having succumbed for a brief time to a surge of success for independent rhythm and blues and rock and roll labels.
- The earliest roots of salsa music emerge in the Latin, especially Puerto Rican, community of New York City.
- The three groups of Old Believers, Russian Orthodox Christians who refused to accept liturgical reform in the 17th century, settle in Woodburn, Oregon; each group has their own distinct style of music, though they will soon syncretize, with one style, known as Harbintsi, becoming the most dominant.
- Many Greek American bands begin playing in a format popularized by Trio Bel Canto, in which vocalists sing in three-part harmony, accompanied by two bouzoukis and a rhythm guitar.
- Irish American showbands, smartly dressed performance groups who did popular covers, begin touring the United States, displacing the dance hall band that had long dominated Irish American music

- Elvis Presley is discharged from the Army and hosts a television show with Frank Sinatra, revitalizing both men's careers.
- Joan Baez signs to Vanguard, marking that label as "the mover and shaker on the (folk music revival) scene".
- The Beatles form and name their band in Liverpool.
- The 3rd United States Infantry Fife and Drum Corps is formed by the Army to play colonial-era instrumentation, primarily for special official occasions. The Corps' Drum Major is the only person in the Army authorized to salute with his left hand.
- Beginning in the spring of this year, "We Shall Overcome" becomes an omnipresent part and an unofficial anthem of civil rights demonstrations.
- George Robinson Ricks' dissertation "Some Aspects of the Religious Music of the United States Negro: An Ethnomusicological Study with Special Emphasis on the Gospel Tradition" is the first lengthy description of African-American gospel music.
- Ornette Coleman begins performing, causing a "major aesthetic controversy" due to his "dissonant harmonic style and abandonment of chorus structures and fixed harmonic changes as means of organizing improvisation flow". This is the beginning of free jazz.
- Robert E. Brown founds a performance-based world music program at Wesleyan University, which includes instruction in Indonesian traditions; Brown will go on to found many similar programs, as well as the Center for World Music in San Francisco.
- James Cleveland has his first "smash hit" with "The Love of God", which helps establish him as one of the foremost entertainers in American gospel music.
- Blues is performed for the first time at the Newport Jazz Festival.
- Elvis Presley's "His Hand in Mine" is a landmark recording that helps define the field of white gospel.

== 1961 ==
- A compilation of Robert Johnson recordings entitled King of the Delta Blues Singers is released, from recordings made in 1936 and 1937. At the time, no photographs of the late blues singer were known, and he was considered a "sort of invisible pop star". The recording turned him into a cultural icon among a "coterie of prominent young musicians", who imitated his style of blues. People like Bob Dylan were inspired by Johnson, drawing on his work as a "source of a tacit ethos, silently transmitted, internationally shared, creating a new mythic example of what rock and roll could be."
- The police attempt to break up a folk musician march and concert in Washington Square Park, leading to a riot. The event is a signal of the return of politics to folk music, having recovered from the blacklisting and McCarthyism of the 1950s.
- Alexander Kuchma, Jack Raymond and Mark Selivan form the Balalaika and Domra Society of New York, which helps sustain and inspire the Russian balalaika orchestra tradition in the United States.
- Composer La Monte Young and Richard Maxfield create a concert series in the loft of Yoko Ono; these are said to have begun the downtown music tradition of New York City.
- Grace Bumbry becomes the first African American to sing at the prestigious Bayreuth Festival.
- Secretary of Labor Arthur Goldberg helps settle a strike of performers at the Metropolitan Opera, perhaps the "first sign of an official governmental policy on the arts".
- Allan and Sandra Jaffe open Preservation Hall in New Orleans, a music venue that helped revitalize the city's jazz scene, and was the only venue in the city at the time to host the traditional black jazz performers.
- Hale Smith's Contours for Orchestra is an influential piece, using avant garde, especially the twelve-tone serial technique.
- Bill Clifton organizes the first bluegrass festival on July 4, which is sparsely attended, in Luray, Virginia.
- The death of Rafael Trujillo in the Dominican Republic leads to "political and social upheaval" in that country and many immigrants coming to the United States, bringing with them Dominican music.
- The first training course in the music education method of Zoltán Kodály is held.
- Mariachi los Camperos de Nati Cano is founded, and will become one of the longest-lasting, most well-known and influential of American mariachi groups.
- Celia Cruz leaves Sonora Matancera, an influential group who had popularized Cuban dance music throughout the Americas; Cruz will go on to become perhaps the longest lasting institution of American salsa music.
- The Famous Ward Singers are the first gospel group to perform in nightclubs.
- The Modern Jazz Quartet opens up the "concert stage to the jazz ensemble" with an unprecedented performance with the Cincinnati Symphony.
- The Clancy Brothers are invited to appear on The Ed Sullivan Show, launching their career and garnering newfound respectability for the Irish American showband tradition.
- The U.S. Navy School of Music is moved to Norfolk, Virginia. During the move, two ships bring bands from Washington, D.C. to Norfolk; along the way, they play in honor of George Washington as they pass his grave.
- The Valadiers become the first white Motown group with their recording of "Greetings, This Is Uncle Sam".

== 1962 ==
- A&M Records, one of the first artist-owned record labels, releases its first hit song, Herb Alpert & His Tijuana Brass' "The Lonely Bull".
- The journal Perspectives of New Music, funded by the Fromm Music Foundation, is first published, aimed at those who link "aesthetic work to complex analytical and compositional systems".
- Otis Redding begins his career recording for Stax/Volt in Memphis, soon becoming the label's best-selling artist.
- Lester Flatt and Earl Scruggs are invited to join the popular sitcom The Beverly Hillbillies, "one of the great coups of the" American folk revival, signalling a newfound acceptance for folk music and bluegrass among mainstream Americans.
- The fanzine Broadside is founded to focus on topical folk music, rapidly becoming one of the most important publications in the field.
- The New State Ballroom opens in Boston, soon becoming the preeminent Irish American music venue and displacing the Intercolonial Hall.
- Though it has never been made clear that he was officially blacklisted, many folk fans come to believe that Pete Seeger has been blacklisted from the popular folk-oriented TV show Hootenanny, leading to a boycott of the show by fans and performers, including the Kingston Trio and Peter, Paul & Mary. Seeger himself, however, though he did believe he had been blacklisted, also encouraged other performers to appear on the show, including Judy Collins, Theo Bikel and the New Lost City Ramblers. Peter, Paul & Mary become among the first major pop groups to take outspoken positions on controversial issues.
- The song "Walk Right In", originally recorded by Gus Cannon & the Jug Stompers in 1930, becomes a major hit for Erik Darling's Rooftop Singers, and an unusually successful single for the American folk revival, otherwise mostly LP-based at the time. The song also prompts a comeback career by Gus Cannon, who had retired from music to work as a gardener in Tennessee.
- Peter, Paul & Mary begin recording for Warner Bros. Records, beginning with Peter, Paul & Mary, leading to their successful career as one of the most popular of the mainstream pop-folk bands, insisting also on complete artistic control over their recordings, a rarity in the era.
- John Barry's score for Dr. No is an important film score in that it was an early work to use rock and medieval music.
- James Cleveland's arrival in California is celebrated by a concert attended by most of the area's gospel elite.
- No Strings, by Richard Rodgers, features the first interracial kiss seen on Broadway.
- Sanford Allen becomes the first full-time African-American violinist with the New York Philharmonic.
- The release of Booker T & the M.G.'s' Green Onions marks the beginning of Memphis soul.
- The British group Blues Incorporated is probably the first all-white Chicago-style blues band in the world.

== 1963 ==
- The audio cassette is introduced by Philips at the Berlin Radio Show.
- Blue Hawaii, an Elvis Presley movie, inspires a wave of interest in the music of Hawaii.
- Bob Dylan begins his career with The Times They Are a-Changin', an "anthem to the generation gap that threw down the gauntlet to older Americans" and helped inspire the musical and social changes of the 1960s.
- A LP recording of James Brown and his band at the Apollo Theater (Live at the Apollo) in Harlem sells more than a million copies, "an astounding figure for a black performer in a market built on singles".
- The Newport Folk Festival becomes a defining event in the American roots revival of the 1960s and 70s; the festival "quietly and forcefully brought together the ideas that had defined the folk revival up until the summer of 1963".
- Peter, Paul & Mary's follow-up to "Puff, the Magic Dragon", a version of Bob Dylan's "Blowin' in the Wind" "perfectly capture(s) the mood of the" generation, and becomes an anthem for the Civil Rights Movement and the anti-war movement.
- Bob Dylan's second album, The Freewheelin' Bob Dylan establishes him as one of the most important acts of the American folk revival and helps fulfill the "promise of an artistic (style of) folk music". It marks him as a bridge "between beat bohemianism and the radical counter culture".
- Folk-oriented performers like Peter LaFarge ("Ballad of Ira Hayes") and Canadian Buffy Sainte-Marie ("Universal Soldier") give "powerful support" to the "emerging Native American movement".
- Jim Kweskin & His Jug Band become one of the stars of a nascent jug band revival with the release of Unblushing Brassiness.
- Harold Courlander publishes one of the first scholarly descriptions of African-American field hollers, cries and calls, based on information obtained by performers from Alabama.
- The first Merrie Monarch Festival is held in Hawaii, in commemoration of the last Hawaiian king, Kalakaua, "who resurrected the hula from the underground".
- James Cleveland and the First Baptist Church Choir of Nutley, New Jersey release a "landmark" live album, Peace Be Still, which will sell more than a million copies.
- Amiri Baraka's Blues People: Negro Music in White America is an influential publication, beginning of scholarly study of the views as a symbol of African-American culture and the African-American experience in the United States. It is the first major book of American music history by an African-American author
- A Washington, D.C. disc jockey named Al Bell begins broadcasting Memphis soul records, the first exposure for that style outside of the black South.
- Fiddler on the Roof marks an important change in the music of Eastern European Jewish Americans, who had previously avoided referencing their homelands in songs, but thereafter, would include nostalgic reminiscing of Eastern Europe.
- The Beatles record and publish their debut LP, Please Please Me.
- Blue Hawaii, a movie starring Elvis Presley, is credited with causing a resurgence of interest in the music of Hawaii.
- The LDS Church opens a Polynesian Cultural Center theme park in Oahu, the most important part of the origin of the pan-Polynesian revue, a tradition designed for tourists and drawing on music and dance from throughout Polynesia.
- Oscar Anderson Hall, the first African American to earn a PhD in music, has his widely performed oratorio Deliverance debuted.
- The Famous Ward Singers become the first gospel group to perform at Radio City Music Hall, while Clara Ward becomes one of the first gospel to stars to appear in films, in a leading role in Tambourines to Glory.
- Howard S. Becker's book Outsiders is an influential work, examining the perceived social deviance of popular musicians. Becker notes that musicians may act within the law, but still have their behavior labeled as sufficiently bizarre to qualify the performers as deviants; he specifically studies jazz musicians, concluding that they often separate themselves (the "hip") from those who respect societal taboos (the "squares").

== 1964 ==
- A performance on The Ed Sullivan Show by the Beatles leads to the beginning of Beatlemania in the United States. "I Want to Hold Your Hand" becomes a #1 single, along with eight other Beatles recordings this year. The movie A Hard Day's Night is also released to great acclaim.
- Folk rock musician Bob Dylan and British rock band The Beatles meet for the first time. Dylan introduces The Beatles to marijuana, an event that changed the direction of The Beatles' career and the development of American rock, from a "music of revelry, a medium for lifting people up and helping them dance their blues away" to a "music of introspective self-absorption, a medium fit for communicating autobiographical intimacies, political discontents, spiritual elation, inviting an audience, not to dance, but to listen—quietly, attentively, thoughtfully."
- The American folk revival begins its decline, sparked in part by the release of an electric cover of "House of the Rising Sun" by The Animals and the politics-free Another Side of Bob Dylan, by Bob Dylan, and the breakups of The Highwaymen, The Tarriers and The Journeymen.
- The first scholarly study of bluegrass music is a dissertation by L. Mayne Smith, and is published in the Journal of American Folklore.
- Terry Riley's minimalist In C becomes an acclaim and famous piece.
- The jazz-based score for The Pink Panther, by Henry Mancini, paves the "way for a new generation of film composers".
- Claude V. Palisca of Yale University organizes a conference and report that criticizes the current methods of music education, leading to federal funding for research in the subject.
- Robert Ashley's Wolfman is a "shocking piece that uses extreme amplification and feedback to change both live speaking and tape".
- Tony Scott's Music for Zen Meditation is generally credited as the first new-age music to be commercially recorded.
- The word soul has become a common musical term in African-American households, but is still not used by most media. It will spread widely in the next few years, however.
- Thee Midniters begin recording, having their first hit with "Land of a Thousand Dances", and becoming the first significant Latin rock band in the country.
- The group Los Fabulosos Cuatro is formed, becoming the first band to perform in a style now known as grupo, in which synthesizers replace more traditional Tejano musical instruments.
- Fania Records, which will go on to become the dominant record label on the early salsa music scene, is founded in New York by Jerry Masucci and Johnny Pacheco.
- John Coltrane's first "large-scale composition", A Love Supreme, is a landmark jazz album that marks his emergence "not only as a technical innovator but also a spiritual leader".
- The British Invasion begins with the "first tours of important English rock groups, namely The Beatles and the Rolling Stones.
- Frank Barsalona founds Premier Talent, the first agency in the country to specialize in rock acts.

== 1965 ==
Mid-1960s music trends
- Duke Ellington's First Sacred Concert
- A revival of interest in Emile Jaques-Dalcroze's eurhythmics, a system of music education for children, begins.
- The idea that "the classical, popular and traditional spheres (of American music) were separate branches of musical activity and also parts of one interdependent whole" takes hold.
- The blues scene of Oakland, California enters its period of greatest popularity and innovation.
- Rock music begins to win "intellectual respectability", while the term rock music, as opposed to rock and roll comes into wide use.
- Modern "music in New York was being transformed by 'a generation of composers who were in open revolt against the academic musical world'"; New York's modern music scene was dominated by three "distinct models of composers' identity": "the composer as intellectual, the composer as experimentalist, and the composer as creator of works for the concert hall".
- The first books intended to teach the banjo through tablature and musical scores appear.
- Many films "situate music near the plot's center, where it usually symbolizes a set of social values subscribed to by the day's youth".
- Dance therapy becomes a recognized field.
- The peak of the Hawaiian Renaissance in traditional music and dance.
- The first performers to work within both Christian gospel music and secular soul music without extensive criticism arise, namely Aretha Franklin and the Staple Singers.
- The term rock and roll begins to be replaced with rock, a broader term that encompasses a range of diverse styles.
- A string of hits establishes the Motown sound as the dominant style of soul music, including recordings by the Temptations, Mary Wells, Marvin Gaye, Martha & the Vandellas, The Supremes and The Four Tops.
- The Clancy Brothers and Tommy Makem inspire a resurgence of interest in traditional Irish folk music among Irish Americans and others.
- A number of organizations designed to promote the cultures of Indian and Pakistani immigrants are founded throughout the United States.
- The Dance of Universal Peace, the most well-known form of Sufi music in the United States, begins, established by Samuel L. Lewis.
- The use of heroin, long associated with jazz musicians, spreads through the rock world, including musicians like Janis Joplin.
- Magnet schools focusing on music begin to appear, in Chicago, Dallas, Houston, Los Angeles and Philadelphia.

- The 82nd Airborne Division Band is part of the forces which occupy the Dominican Republic. Later in the year, in order to boost morale and support from the locals for the Americans, the Band participates in a parade. Bandsmen carry rifles on their backs during the parade to remind the populace of the strength and power of the American military.
- The federal government begins funding composers through the National Foundation on the Arts and Humanities, later the National Endowment for the Arts, which is "roughly modeled on the British Arts Council".
- The Beatles' "Norwegian Wood (This Bird Has Flown)", the first popular recording to include a sitar, which is played more like a Western instrument than an Indian one. Many bands of the British Invasion and American psychedelic rock groups begin using a sitar elements of Indian music, to add a touch of exoticism to their recordings, creating a field sometimes called raga rock.
- Bob Dylan's performance with a rock and roll band at the Newport Folk Festival is a controversial landmark event in the American roots revival and the development of folk-rock, with many commentators pointing to it as a landmark in the decline of the American folk revival. The show carries Dylan into the "openly commercial arena of the popular sphere, where a family of idioms soon to be known as 'rock' music was developing out of rock and roll. This year also saw the departure of folk band The Byrds for a more rock-oriented style.
- Bob Dylan's "Like a Rolling Stone" is a breakthrough single, notable for its length of over six minutes, in contrast to the standard pop single of no more than about three minutes.
- James Brown's "Papa's Got a Brand New Bag" is a breakthrough recording that showcases Brown's move from "conventional song structures and toward a new emphasis on movement and dance", paving the way for the development of funk".
- Jam band the Grateful Dead begin their career, as The Warlocks, performing at an acid test in San Francisco.
- Drawing on Judy Henske's High Flying Bird the previous year, Judy Roderick and Fred Neil release their respective breakthrough albums, Woman Blue and Bleecker and MacDougal, heralding a new form of folk music that drew on more diverse influences, while Bob Gibson's Where I'm Bound and Bob Camp's Paths of Victory used "unusual chords... that opened up melodic riches unknown in the three-chord world of folk".
- The Fugs release The Fugs First Album, combining folk, rock and country with other unusual influences. Their work was unique at the time, and has led the band to be referred to as a "prototype punk band".
- John Coltrane records Om, a pioneering album that incorporated African and Asian musical techniques and instruments into his work.
- The first bluegrass festival is held.
- Muhal Richard Abrams creates the Association for the Advancement of Creative Musicians, an organization that helped Chicago regain prominence as a center for innovative jazz. The organization would go onto produce the careers of Ed Wilkerson, Anthony Braxton, Roscoe Mitchell and Henry Threadgill.
- A disastrous performance of Milton Babbitt's Relata I is the "most famous example of the problems musicians" face in playing his music.
- Barry McGuire's "Eve of Destruction" becomes a "hugely popular" protest song.
- Country Joe & the Fish release "I-Feel-Like-I'm-Fixin'-to-Die-Rag", the "most memorable anti-war song of the decade".
- Containing only original compositions, the Beatles' Rubber Soul establishes a new approach among pop acts whereby an album is created as an artistic work, rather than a collection of hit songs and filler material.
- Steve Halpern begins studying the "healing effects of music"; he will go on to pioneer new-age music.
- The Left Bank Jazz Society begins holding weekly concerts featuring major jazz musicians; the tapes will become a "treasure trove" for jazz aficionados, but do not begin to be officially released until 2000.
- The 1965 Immigration Act eliminates quotas based on national origin for immigrants, leading to a surge in immigration from Taiwan and Hong Kong, further diversifying the Chinese American musical community; similarly, more diversity in immigration from India, Pakistan and the Middle East results in fractured and more specialized music scenes among immigrants from those areas.
- Duke Ellington presents the first jazz concert in a major church, Grace Cathedral Church of San Francisco, California. This concert, and several subsequent ones, contribute "largely to the growing movement for making the music of the worship service more relevant to the times".
- Charles Radcliff, in the UK periodical Anarchy, is the first person to denounce the phenomenon of the white blues performer.
- Good News becomes the first Christian folk musical.
- The Federal Communications Commission rules that owners of both the AM and FM stations in an area must offer different programming on each, leading to the ruse of underground album rock radio.
- Nortronics introduces the eight-track head and an endless-loop cartridge machine.

== 1966 ==
- The Beatles give their last live performance, in Candlestick Park in San Francisco, marking a "basic shift in the life of the group", which would go on to focus on studio innovation and experimentation with "new textures and forms, with a breadth of view that came to include avant-garde techniques from the classical sphere and even the music of India".
- Artist Andy Warhol, founder of The Factory in New York, branches out with a musical event that would turn him into the "most consequential rock Svengali since Brian Epstein and Andrew Loog Oldham." The show was the premier of a band called the Velvet Underground, who would become legends of the modern rock scene, inspiring thousands of rock acts, "aiming to challenge and provoke" to "emulate the Velvet Underground's dark style and minimalist sound".
- Reverend David A. Noebel publishes Rhythm, Riots, and Revolution, which inflames debate about the presence of Communism in music, especially folk and folk-rock.
- Charles Keil's Urban Blues is a landmark of American urban ethnomusicology, focusing on the music of African Americans who had relocated from rural Southern states to Northern cities.
- Barry Sadler's "Ballad of the Green Berets" is the most successful of the pro-Vietnam War songs.
- The Beatles' Revolver becomes the first major American-derived popular music to be influenced by Asian techniques and instrumentation.
- Charley Pride becomes the first African American to perform on the Grand Ole Opry.
- Edward V. Bonnemere's Missa Hodierno is the "first jazz Mass to be performed in a Roman Catholic church as part of a traditional service".
- Arthur Mitchell forms the first African-American classical ballet company in New York.
- Paul Williams' Crawdaddy! is the first rock fanzine, and may be considered the first rock magazine of any kind.
- Zoltán Kodály appears at a Music Educators National Conference in Ann Arbor, Michigan, inspiring American teachers to use European techniques in elementary school music education.
- EMI and Philips are the first major record companies to issue cassettes in addition to LPs.
- Ford Motors begins supplying its cars with a Stereo 8, an eight-track player, built into the dashboard.
- The first rock concept albums are released by The Mothers of Invention (Freak Out!) and The Beach Boys (Pet Sounds).

== 1967 ==
- Rolling Stone magazine is founded, one of several created in the late 1960s, celebrating the countercultural spirit of the times.
- The Beatles' Sgt. Pepper's Lonely Hearts Club Band is released; it has been called the "first 'art rock' album".
- A number of San Francisco-based rock bands gain national attention, including Quicksilver Messenger Service, Country Joe and the Fish, Grateful Dead, Big Brother and the Holding Company, Moby Grape and Jefferson Airplane.
- The Monterey Pop Festival is held in Monterey, California, introducing a number of soon-to-be popular bands, including the Grateful Dead, The Byrds, Otis Redding, Ravi Shankar, The Who and Jimi Hendrix, and helping shape the counterculture. Shankar becomes the first to popularize the music of India in the United States. The Festival attracts more than 50,000 people, and inspires the music industry to organize even more grandiose concerts.
- The first "Human Be-In" is staged in Golden Gate Park in San Francisco. The event was a gathering of hippies and other countercultural types, featuring the band Grateful Dead and an outdoor acid test, the Be-In resulted in media exposure for the counterculture.
- Chet Helms introduces San Francisco's acid rock scene to the "hipsters of swinging London".
- The Doors' The Doors is released, establishing the band's reputation for an innovative form of dark psychedelic rock, led by frontman Jim Morrison.
- The Congress on Research in Dance (CORD) is formed to encourage "research in all aspects of dance"; it has been "instrumental in building a body of literature on dance scholarship".
- The Tanglewood Summit, sponsored by the Music Educators National Conference, suggests broadening the music taught in schools to include pop, folk and avant-garde music.
- The Division of Performing Arts is created by the Smithsonian Institution.
- Approximate: The word groupie is first used to describe devoted female followers of a particular band, often carrying sexual connotations.
- James Brown's "There Was a Time" and "Cold Sweat (Part 1)" are the first to use a polyrhythmic style featuring a "syncopated bass line, a strong heavy backbeat from the drummer, a counter choppy line from the guitar or keyboard, and someone singing on top of that in a gospel style". This is the basis for funk.
- The foundation of two music schools in California, the Ali Akbar College of Music and the Kinnara School of Music, leads to increased national prominence for Indian classical music in the United States.
- Monterey Pop Festival is the first rock concert documentary.
- Clarence Rivers composes Brother of Man, one of the first successful jazz Masses, which is debuted at the Newport Jazz Festival this year.
- It is revealed that the Central Intelligence Agency is the primary force behind both Radio Free Europe and Radio Liberty.
- A Bob Dylan double album, Great White Wonder, is the first unauthorized rock recording, and the beginning of the modern era of bootlegs.
- The Vulcan Gas Company is opened in Austin, Texas. It will help establish the city as a center for Texas rock.

== 1968 ==
Late 1960s music trends
- Pulitzer Prizes are given to works by a number of composers from academic environments, including Leslie Bassett's Variations for Orchestra, Leon Kirchner's String Quartet No. 3, George Crumb's Echoes of Time and the River and Karel Hausa's String Quartet No. 3.
- Light comedies featuring popular music performers become a major part of American television programming, most prominently including The Monkees, The Partridge Family and The Archies.
- Some composers begin working with music that draws on older European styles, a field called New Romanticism; these include Lukas Foss, George Rochberg, George Crumb, Jacob Druckman, William Bolcom and David del Tredici.
- Alex Bradford emerges at the forefront of modern gospel, one of a number of influential singer-songwriters to emerge at this time.
- The Pinewoods Morris Men, based out of Pinewoods Camp near Plymouth, Massachusetts, performs in the streets of Cambridge. This is followed by a number of similar public performances in the region.
- Rock bands begin incorporating more sophisticated and complex elements of music into their album-oriented music, creating progressive rock. This is primarily a British phenomenon, but has American practitioners and fans, and will become more well established in North America in the next decade.
- Several Native American ethnomusicologists begin to publish works on the musics of the indigenous peoples of the Southeast United States, including Edwin Schupman's study of Creek music, David Draper on Choctaw music, and Marcia Herndon and Charlotte Heth on Cherokee music.
- Clubs catering to African-American gay men in New York City begin to play an uninterrupted stream of Latin, soul and funk music; this is the origin of disco music.
- Mariachi grows in popularity among Mexican-Americans, buoyed by the institution of school programs in Texas, Arizona and California, and the pioneering of the first nightclub where mariachi is "presented on stage as a dinner show" in Los Angeles.
- Carlos Santana begins recording, quickly becoming the first major innovator in the field of Latin rock.
- A resurgence in popularity for the conjunto begins among Tejanos.
- The Haitian community in New York is large enough to support a significant music industry based around small dances and small bands called mini-djaz, known for a mixture of Haitian, American and Latino musics.
- The British Invasion leads to the prominence of British bands like The Beatles, Rolling Stones and The Who throughout the United States.
- W. A. Mathieu begins working with the Dances of Universal Peace, creating new compositions for mixed chorus and instrumental ensembles for that movement.
- The Black Power movement inspires a wave of research centers and performance ensembles dedicated to African-American music, among the most influential being Dominique René de Lerma's Black Music Center at Indiana University.
- A number of bands begin producing music with feminist- or lesbian-oriented lyrics, including the New Harmony Sisterhood Band, Miss Saffman's Ladies Sewing Circle and the Chicago Women's Liberation Rock Band.
- A number of geographers begin investigating the relationship between music, place and space, largely drawing upon the idea of the cultural hearth – a homeland from which a particular aspect of culture diffuses – first described by Carl Sauer and Berkeley School of cultural geography.
- Rock comes to be seen as distinct from pop music, and is felt by many to be more authentic due to its roots in American folk music, more artistic and to better express the feelings of its audience.
- Death becomes a common subject for popular music, drawing on recent hits like The Shangri-Las' "Leader of the Pack" and songs in tribute to stars that had died. Many popular songs from this period and beyond begin using an aeolian chordal progression, which is otherwise most commonly associated with classical requiems, such as "All Along the Watchtower" by Bob Dylan and Jimi Hendrix – this technique, which gives a recording a morbid or spooky theme, had been used since at least 1949, with Vaughn Monroe's "(Ghost) Riders in the Sky".
- The hippie cultural movement, which includes music as an integral part, reaches its peak of popularity and influence.
- Rock albums begins to be released with fold-out posters, stickers and lyric sheets, rather than simple album covers.

- Asian Music begins circulation; it is the first magazine to focus on scholarly research on Asian music.
- Blue Cheer releases Vincebus Eruptum one of the earliest albums to feature heavy metal distortion.
- Jerry Goldsmith's score for Planet of the Apes helps "revitalize the symphonic score, using existing practices and vocabularies".
- Richard M. Graham becomes the first African American on the faculty at the University of Georgia after he is made an assistant professor of music.
- Robert Moog's Switched-On Bach, conceived and performed by Wendy Carlos, becomes a hit and brings "to the fore fascinating issues of electronic 'orchestration'".
- When riots threaten Detroit, DJ Martha Jean Steinberg is credited for calming her listeners by playing gospel music.
- The first books on rock are published: J. Marks' Rock and Other Four Letter Words and John Gabree's The World of Rock.
- Olly Wilson wins Dartmouth College's first prize for electronic music, for his composition Cetus for electronic tape.
- The National Black Theater in Harlem begins producing works using African and Caribbean-derived dance, music and ritual elements.
- Hair is a "revolutionary" rock musical, by Galt MacDermot, James Rado and Gerome Ragni. It opens the "way for other rock musicals".
- Aretha Franklin is featured on the cover of Time magazine, along with a lengthy article entitled "Lady Soul Singing It Like It Is"; a year later, Billboard magazine will begin using the term soul in place of "rhythm and blues". These two events constitute the beginning of the media's acceptance of the term soul.
- Duvalier begins suppressing student activism in Haiti, leading to a wave of emigration to the United States; many of these activists organize groups in major North American cities, most famously including Atis Endepandan, Tanbou Libete, Haïti Culturelle and Soley Leve. This movement is known as kilti libete (freedom culture).
- The International Polka Association is founded, focusing in large part on promoting Polish American polka.
- The Black Artists Group is formed in St. Louis, Missouri, featuring Charles "Bobo" Shaw, Julius Hemphill, Hamiet Bluiett and Oliver Lake, leading to that city's rise in prominence in the field of jazz.
- Marcus Thompson becomes the first African American with a "notable career" as a violist.
- Bill C. Malone's Country Music U.S.A. is the first major history of country music.
- A festival is held in New Orleans, as part of the city's 250th celebration. The festival will be held every year, eventually becoming the New Orleans Jazz & Heritage Festival, one of the premier jazz festivals in the country.

== 1969 ==
- The American blues roots revival peaks.
- The funeral of gospel singer Roberta Martin is attended by 50,000 people in Chicago, without any national media coverage; this event comes to be seen as a "symbol of black gospel music's place in American life: a blend of acceptance and obscurity".
- The Stonewall riots forces mainstream Americans to recognize the existence of homosexuality, and gay men begin making a musical "impact felt beyond their immediate communities", especially in the field of disco.
- Edwin Hawkins' "Oh Happy Day" is a surprise crossover gospel hit, a "jolt of energy that cut through the static and the airwaves in the spring of 1969". It "ushered in the contemporary gospel era", and was innovative in its use of horns, bongoes and the Fender bass. The song is the first true hybrid of rhythm and blues and gospel.
- Ovation creates a pioneering electric-acoustic hybrid guitar by adding amplification to a plastic-backed acoustic guitar.
- Jim Morrison of The Doors is arrested for public indecency after controversially flashing his genitalia onstage in Miami.
- The first explicitly lesbian-oriented popular song is released, "Angry Atthis" by Maxine Feldman.
- Influential gospel label Malaca Records is founded.
- The first Christian rock album is Larry Norman's Upon This Rock.
- Phyl Garland's The Sound of Soul is an influential publication, focusing on the social context behind the emergence and acceptance of African-American soul music in the United States.
- The Gospel Music Association begins issuing the Dove Awards, to reward gospel artists.
- The Institute for Jazz Research begins publishing Jazzforschung/Jazz Research, a German and English periodical and one of the earliest popular music journals.
- The James Cleveland Gospel Music Workshop of America is founded, the largest gospel convention of the time, with more than 20,000 annual attendees.
- After performing at the Newport Jazz Festival with several rock bands, Miles Davis records Bitches Brew, an influential recording that fuses jazz and rock.
- Phyl Garland's The Sound of Soul is an influential study of African-American music that shapes the future of academic research on soul music.
- Recordings by Sly & the Family Stone are an innovative step in the development of funk, which used elements of rock, such as the fuzz box, wah-wah pedal, vocal distortion and the echo chamber, in soul-based music. In hits like "Hot Fun in the Summertime", "Stand!" and "Thank You (Falettinme Be Mice Elf Again)", bassist Larry Graham created a unique style on the bass guitar, using "pulling, plucking, thumping and slapping" to "produce a distinctive percussive style".
- The Songwriters Hall of Fame is founded.
- The first Tamburitza Extravaganza is held by the Tamburitza Association of America.
- A fan is stabbed to death by one of the Hells Angels, who had been hired by the Rolling Stones to provide security for a concert at Altamont.
- The Woodstock Music and Arts Fair is held in New York. It is considered a defining event for the era which helped shape the hippie movement and the counterculture.
- The Wally Heider Recording Studio is founded by Wally Heider, quickly becoming the standard recording facility for San Francisco's psychedelic rock scene.
