= Seymour Barab =

American composer and musician (1921–2014)

Seymour Barab (January 9, 1921 – June 28, 2014) was an American composer of opera, songs and instrumental and chamber music, as well as a cellist, organist and pianist. He was best known for his fairy tale operas for young audiences, such as Chanticleer and Little Red Riding Hood. He was a longtime member of the Philip Glass Ensemble.

== Early life ==
Barab was born in Chicago, Illinois, to Samuel Barab and Leah Yablunky. Both of Barab's parents were Polish immigrants, who emigrated separately and met in the United States. His older brother, Abraham (b. 1913), later changed his name to Oscar. Barab's father also changed his name in later years to Leo. The family had little money, but Barab's parents considered culture important, and he was given piano lessons, from an early age, at first with his aunt, Gertrude Yablunky.

When Barab was thirteen, he started his first musical job as an organist for a church of spiritual healing that his aunt attended. Barab began to study the cello when he entered Lane Tech High School in Chicago in 1935. Lane Tech offered a four-year music program and required each student to study an orchestral instrument. He later said of his choice: "They happened to need cellos. If they had needed a French horn player, I’d be a French horn player". Barab also took lessons with the high school orchestra conductor. While at Lane Tech Barab became friends with Ben Weber and George Perle, both of whom would go on to become well known contemporary composers. Together, in 1938, the three founded the New Music Group of Chicago presenting contemporary 20th-century music. They programmed their own compositions in addition to works by other contemporary composers. Most notably, they gave the Chicago premier of Béla Bartók's First String Quartet. Barab became a lifelong champion of contemporary music. Barab later said of Weber and Perle: "I learned from them. I learned all about music, really. It gave me something to be dedicated to, unplayed music by talented composers. Of course we were all very young then. I just decided that this was what I wanted to do, rather than play the concerto repertoire and the sonata repertoire."

== Performance career ==
After finishing high school, Barab began his first professional position was as a cellist in the Indianapolis Symphony Orchestra. This was followed by positions with orchestras in other cities around the United States including Cleveland, Philadelphia, San Francisco and Portland, Oregon. and with The Chicago Civic Orchestra and the Brooklyn Philharmonic. Barab later recalled: "I went from one [orchestra] to the other, which is hard to imagine these days. … You stayed in one, one season. Then, you moved up to a better orchestra."

During World War II, Barab joined the Navy as musician and was stationed in the Philadelphia Navy Yard where he learned to play clarinet and played in the military band. According to Barab, the main reason he was stationed in the Philadelphia Navy Yard was because Eugene Ormandy recruited him as a cellist so there would be a string orchestra "to play for the Officer’s Lunch". During this time, Barab played with the Philadelphia Orchestra and studied cello with Gregor Piatigorsky, who was teaching at Curtis Institute of Music. Toward the end of the war, Barab married Shirley Gabis, but the marriage ended in an annulment five years later. Barab and his wife moved to New York City, where he played for both the American Broadcasting Company and the Columbia Broadcasting System. He also played in the Galimir String Quartet and helped to found the New Music Quartet of New York. With Noah Greenberg, he later founded the New York Pro Musica Antiqua in which Barab played viola da gamba.

== Compositional career and musical style ==
Barab began composing during a year that he spent in Paris, France, from 1950 to 1951 on the G.I. Bill. There he worked with Rene Liebowitz as a recording producer, and together they recorded operas and symphonies. When asked what drew him to composition, Barab answered: "[E]ventually I came to think that [composers] had a much better life than I had, they could do what they did anywhere, but I was kinda stuck with a job or with commitments, that sort of thing. I've always been interested in fooling around writing music". Barab also suggested that his relationship with a singer, Pat Neway, and the upright piano in his rented Parisian apartment, that led to the start of his composition in France, saying, "I would play and she would sing. I would act like sort of a coach. Gradually, I began to get interested in writing for the voice." Barab wrote strictly songs when he was in Paris, but he soon began to venture into other genres.

Upon his return from Paris, Barab was offered a position as an assistant professor of cello at Black Mountain College in North Carolina. There he met his second wife, Mary Ann, with whom he had two children, Miriam and Jesse, and he also completed one of his first songs cycles, A Child's Garden of Verses. The recording of this song cycle, sung by Russell Oberlin, sold well and led to Barab receiving a job as a professor of composition at Rutgers University. He took another job at the New England Conservatory of Music starting the Composer's Quartet. He recalled: "Our idea then was to do nothing but contemporary music and especially contemporary music that nobody else would play. I loved that, doing things that just aren't going to be done. That gave me a real purpose in life." Two more of his songs cycles were published before the end of the 1950s that continued to further his reputation as a composer of tonal music, namely Four Songs and Songs of Perfect Propriety.

In the mid-1950s, Barab began to work on opera composition, collaborating with librettist M. C. Richards on a one-act piece that would eventually become his first opera, Chanticleer. Chanticleer premiered in Aspen, Colorado, on August 4, 1956, was met with favorable reviews, and gained success. David M. Epstein reviewed the premier in Musical America, stating that the piece is a "humorous affair done with a delightful, light touch. Barab has provided a tuneful setting, relatively simple harmonically, but handled with freshness. … With its small cast and charming writing, this should be a popular work with small companies." Barab came to be known for this simple and tuneful musical style in his compositions throughout his career. In 1957, Barab's second opera, A Game of Chance, with a libretto by E. Manacher, premiered in Rock Island, Illinois, and was also received well.

Barab's opera of the fairy tale Little Red Riding Hood (1962) is not only his most performed opera, but it is the most often performed opera by any American composer. It paved the way for more of Barab's fairy tale and children's operas for which he is best known. Barab composed the opera for a program called "Young Audiences" that toured around public schools. For the first time, Barab wrote the libretto himself, providing a prologue in which the singer playing the part of the wolf gets his make up done on stage in front of the audience, allowing the children to see the transformation to reassure the children that the wolf is really just a man in costume. In his other fairy tale operas, Barab continued to cut or contextualize the violence, sometimes tweaking the story to emphasize the moral point.

In 1971 Barab divorced Mary Ann, and in 1972, he was married a third time to Margie King. Together they had a daughter, Sarah. Barab continued to compose new works. His full-length opera Phillip Marshall was nominated for a Pulitzer Prize. Gerald Helund, in a review of Phillip Marshall, commented that Barab's libretto is "packed with power, believability, and character with depth, animation and color. This Civil War 'mainstream mondern' work belongs on the operatic agenda for 1976 with Ward's The Crucible and Floyd's Susannah. American Opera could have three no better representatives."

Barab continued to be an active composer until his death at age 93 in Manhattan, New York City, composing operas, songs, instrumental works, and innovative narrated instrumental works. In 1998 he was presented with a Lifetime Achievement Award by the National Opera Association.
