= Martha Blackman =

American musician (1927–2021)

- Born: January 1, 1927; Dallas, Texas, U.S.
- Died: November 17, 2021 (aged 94); Palo Alto, California, U.S.
- Occupation: Musician

Martha Elizabeth Blackman (January 1, 1927 – November 17, 2021) was an American viola da gamba player and lutenist.

== Biography ==
Blackman was born in Dallas, Texas. She studied cello at the Juilliard School under Leonard Rose. Receiving a Fulbright Scholarship (1953–54), she studied the viola da gamba, first in Munich and then at the Hochschule für Musik Freiburg. She returned to the USA in 1954 and appeared as a leading gamba soloist, and also joining the New York Pro Musica working under Noah Greenberg from 1954 to 1961, during which she did most of her recording. Together with Paul Maynard and Bernard Krainis, she formed the New York Pro Musica Baroque Trio, and was also a member of the Stanley Buetens Lute Ensemble.

From 1970 Blackman was a long time lecturer at Stanford University. She received an International Research & Exchanges Board (IREX) Fellowship for research of Eastern European folk and Renaissance music at the Charles University in Prague. Blackman was an expert in French ornamentation in Baroque string music, the lyra viol, the composer Tobias Hume, and the clàrsach and its repertoire.

Blackman died on November 17, 2021, in Palo Alto, California, at the age of 94.

== Publications ==
Academic papers include: "A New Star", Albertus Magnus Alumnae, 3 (2) :4-7, 1966, an English translation of Hans Judenkünig's "Ain Schone Kunstliche Underweisung (1523)," Lute Society Journal, Vol XIV, 1972, various editions of early music, and for the International Horn Society Journal (unpublished), "Hunting Horns in Viola da Gamba Music".

== Recordings ==
The majority of her recordings are with the New York Pro Musica at Decca. Other recordings include Experiences Anonymous, Columbia, and on other labels.
