= Frederick Renz =

Frederick Renz is a conductor, director, and keyboardist specializing in Early Music spanning the medieval through the classical eras. He is the founder of the Early Music Foundation and directs its performing group Early Music New York, an internationally performing ensemble and artist in residence at the Cathedral of St. John the Divine in New York City. Renz is also noted for his work in medieval drama, and has directed and produced works such as Daniel and the Lions and Le Roman de Fauvel based largely on his own musicological research.

== Education ==
Renz received his undergraduate degree in piano performance at State University of New York at Fredonia. He completed a master's degree in harpsichord performance at Indiana University, where he also completed course work for a doctorate in conducting with Willi Apel and Julius Herford. In 1962 he received a Fulbright grant to study in the Netherlands with eminent harpsichordist and scholar Gustav Leonhardt at the Amsterdam Conservatory.

== Career ==
Renz performed as a keyboard soloist with New York Pro Musica for six seasons and founded the Early Music Foundation when it disbanded in 1974. He continues to direct Early Music New York and frequently plays keyboard instruments in its performances. Many of these performances, including his recreations of medieval dramas, have been commissioned by the Metropolitan Museum of Art. He has also directed a large catalogue of recordings with Early Music New York released by the Early Music Foundation's Ex Cathedra Records. In addition to his work directing Early Music New York, Renz has given many solo performances on harpsichord, appeared in numerous chamber groups and orchestras, and recorded for Nonesuch, Lyrichord, Foné, Decca, Vanguard, and the Musical Heritage Society. He is also interested in music peripheral to the canon of French, German, English, and Italian music, and has been instrumental in reviving overlooked works from Eastern Europe, Latin America, and Colonial North America. Renz announced his retirement as the Director of Early Music at the end of the stellar program Concerto per Violini—18th Century Italian Virtuosi on May 13, 2023. It was performed at the First Church of Christ, Scientist located at Central Park West and 68th Street in New York City. The concert marked the end of 48 years of Early Music performances. A member of the board of the Early Music Foundation stated that plans for future performances are as yet unclear.
