= David Young (recorder musician) =

American musician

- Genres: Easy listening Meditation; Spiritual
- Occupations: Singer-songwriter, record producer
- Instruments: Recorder, guitar, vocals
- Years active: 1990–present
- Label: Universe Music
- Website: www.davidyoungmusic.com

David Young is an American musician. He is known for his ability to play two recorders simultaneously. He was also a member of the new age duo Celestial Winds with harpist Lisa Franco.

== Life and career ==
Young started playing the recorder in the third grade in Brooklyn, New York. He studied baroque and renaissance music with Phil Levin and at age 12 he became the youngest member to join the New York Recorder Guild advanced performing group.

Young's music has been featured on the U.S. television series' General Hospital, All My Children and Passions.

He has worked recorded with artists such as Bobby Schnitzer, Cheryl Gallagher, and Robin Berry.

1994: CNN does special segment on David Young's "rags to riches" story. David Young's Christmas Morning CD is #2 in Canada.

1998: Young performs at Heather McCartney's launch of her gift line in Atlanta, Georgia.

2001: David Young Musical Greeting Card line launched.

2004: Young writes, produces and acts in the movie Village of Dreams, filmed at the Käthe Wohlfahrt Christmas store in Rothenburg, Germany. A companion children's book was made along with the Village of Dreams movie.

2005: David writes and produces a musical called Woodstock: The Mystery of Destiny, which has been performed at various theaters.

== Discography ==
Albums

- Ancient Treasures (2005)
- The Best of Bread (2008)
- Beyond Celestial Winds (2004)
- Bliss (1996)
- Butterfly Kisses
- By Candlelight
- By Candelight, Volume II
- Celestial Winds I
- A Christmas Dream (2005)
- A Christmas I'll Remember (2006)
- Christmas Morning
- Creation
- David
- David Young (2003)
- Deep Spirit
- Happiness (2003)
- Harp Dreams
- Home: Songs for America
- Imagine (2005)
- Imagine, Volume II (2005)
- The Inner Child (2005)
- Inner Journey's
- Life Stories (1996)
- Lullabies by the Ocean
- Merry Christmas (2003)
- Midnight Serenade (2007)
- Mystical Journey
- Oceans of Love (2004)
- Perfect Wedding
- Renaissance (2003)
- A Renaissance Christmas (2003)
- Romantic Moments
- Romantic Moments II
- Sacred Guitar
- Sacred Love Songs
- Solace
- Songs of Hope (2005)
- Sweet Dreams
- Woodstock: The Mystery of Destiny (2005)

Video

- From Venice Beach to Woodstock (2007)
- Village of Dreams (2006)
