= Aaron Brown (musician) =

- Genres: Early
- Occupations: Musician, teacher
- Instruments: Violin, rebec
- Website: www.aaronbrownviolin.com

Aaron Joel Brown (born 1980) is an Australian-American violinist, composer and teacher, specializing in Early Music. He is a founder of the trio, Guido's Ear. Brown became a member of the Australian Brandenburg Orchestra in 2009. He has worked with American early music groups, Early Music New York, Opera Lafayette and the New York Collegium. He currently plays rebec with the medieval music ensemble Fractio Modi, based in Brisbane, Australia.

Brown studied music at the Juilliard School, the Mannes School of Music and Hunter College. His teachers were Dorothy Delay and Lewis Kaplan.

== Discography ==
Solo records:

- Aaron Brown - Baroque Violin (2008)
- Early Modern (2016)

With the Australian Brandenburg Orchestra:

- Tapas Taste of the Baroque (2010)
- Brandenburg Celebrates (2015)
