= Rudolph Ganz =

Swiss-American pianist and composer (1877–1972)

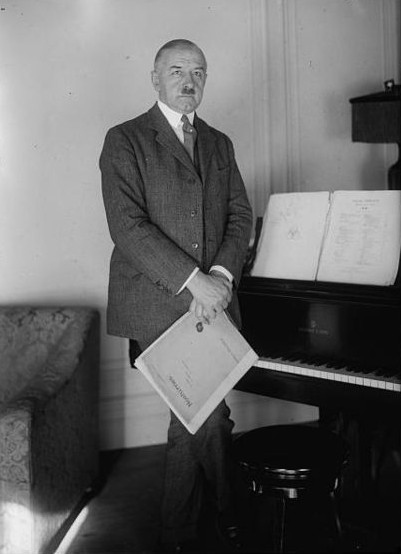
- Library of Congress collection
- Born: Rudolph Ganz; 24 February 1877; Zurich, Switzerland
- Died: 2 August 1972 (aged 95); Paris, France
- Occupations: Composer; Pianist; Conductor; Teacher

Rudolph Ganz (February 24, 1877 – August 2, 1972) was a Swiss-American pianist, conductor, composer, and teacher.

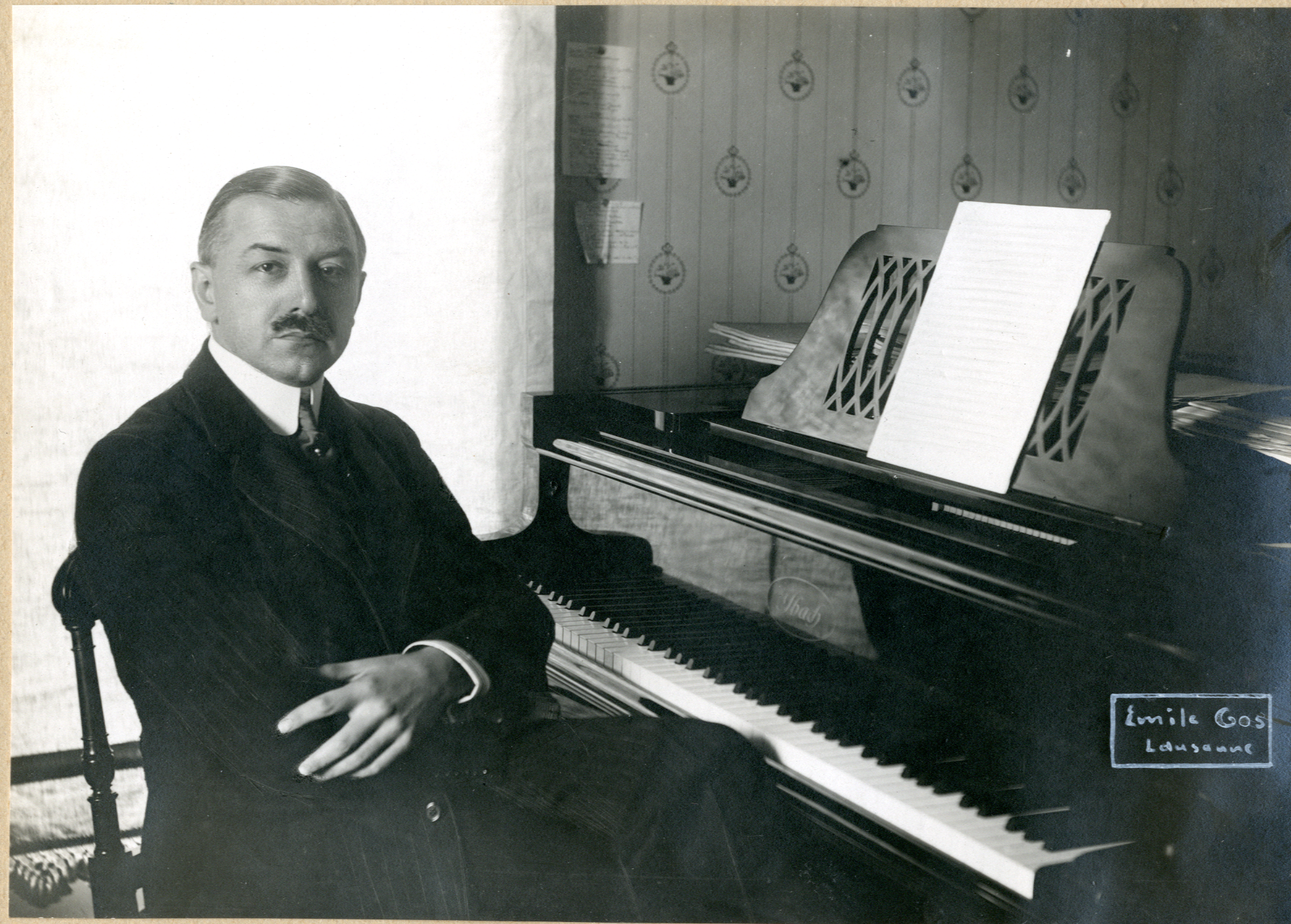
Pianist, composer, conductor, and music educator Rudolph Ganz seated at his piano, Lausanne, Switzerland, 1912 (Rudolph Ganz Papers, The Newberry Library).

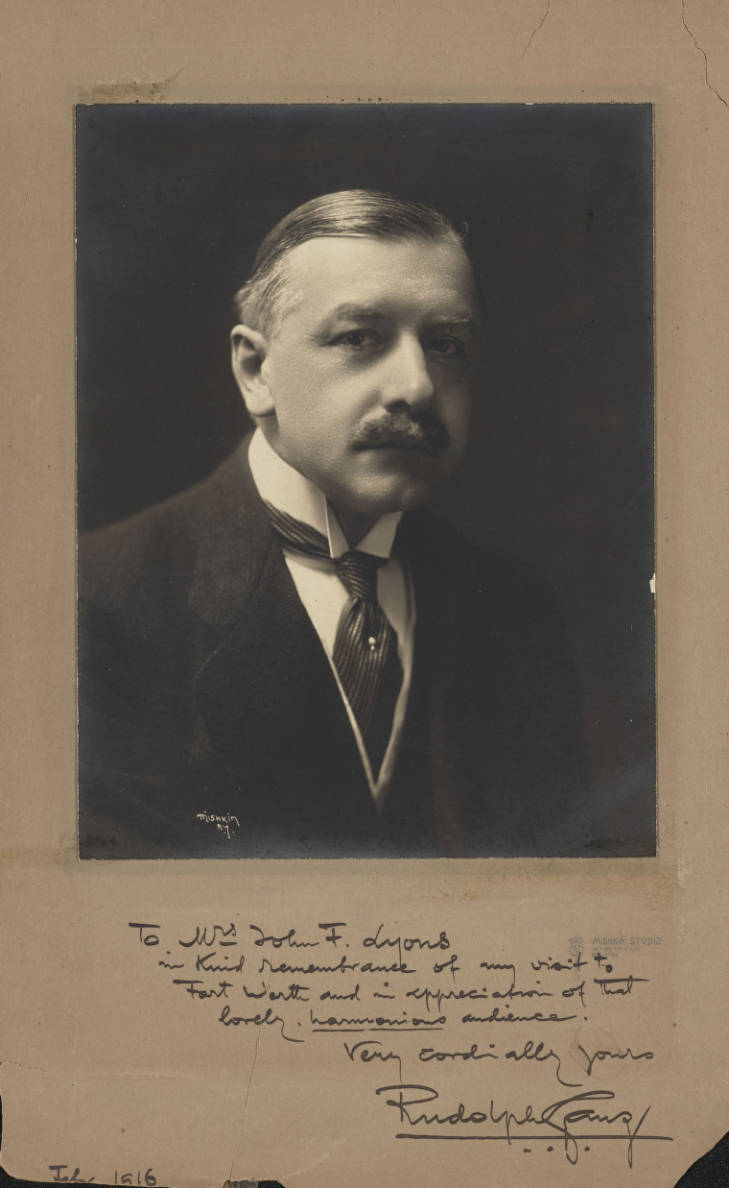
Rudolph Ganz in 1916 (Fort Worth Public Library Archives)

== Early career as a pianist and conductor ==
Born in Zurich, Ganz studied cello with Friedrich Hegar and piano with Robert Freund at the Zürich Musikschule. He also took composition lessons with Charles Blanchet at the Lausanne Conservatory. From 1897 to 1898, Ganz studied piano with Fritz Blumer in Strasbourg, and from 1899 to 1900 with Ferruccio Busoni in Berlin and Weimar and composition with Heinrich Urban in Berlin. On 7 December 1899, he made his piano debut with the Berlin Philharmonic Orchestra; and on 14 April 1900, his conducting debut with this orchestra in the world premiere of his own Symphony No. 1 in E major. In May, Florenz Ziegfeld, Sr. visited Berlin and invited Ganz to join the piano department of the Chicago Musical College. In August 1900, Ganz moved to Chicago.

Ganz joined the piano department and became a member of the board of directors of the Chicago Musical College from fall 1900 through spring 1905. On March 20, 1903, Ganz made his American orchestral debut as soloist with the Chicago Symphony Orchestra under Theodore Thomas in the first Chicago performance of Vincent d'Indy's Symphony No. 1, at the Auditorium Theatre. On 5 March 1905, in a Chicago recital at the Music Hall (in the Fine Arts Building), Ganz became the first pianist to perform Maurice Ravel's music (Jeux d'eau (Ravel)) in the United States (Harold Bauer played a first Boston performance of Jeux d'eau on 4 December 1905).

From fall 1905 to spring 1908 Ganz lived in New York City and began concert tours throughout North America, Europe, and Cuba. On 8 November 1907, in New York's Mendelssohn Hall, Ganz played the American premiere of Ravel's Oiseaux tristes and Barque sur l'ocean (from Miroirs, 1905). In 1908 he moved to Berlin to teach and concertize. He played first Berlin performances of Vincent d'Indy and Béla Bartók and first London performances of Ravel and John Alden Carpenter. His Berlin pupils included Chicago pianist Edward Joseph Collins, St. Louis pianist Leo C. Miller, Kansas City pianist and later Ganz's assistant Mollie Margolies, Norwegian pianist Nils Larsen, and American composers Charles Haubiel and Edward Ballantine. In 1913 Ganz began recording piano rolls for Welte-Mignon and Duo-Art, and in 1916 for Pathé. At the outbreak of World War I in 1914, Ganz returned to New York City and taught at the Institute of Musical Art (later The Juilliard School). In 1920 in Carnegie Hall, he conducted the New York Philharmonic in his own performance of Franz Liszt's E-flat Major Piano Concerto, using the Aeolian Company's Duo-Art reproducing Weber grand piano and becoming the first pianist to conduct an orchestra for the concerto in which he played by piano roll.

== Later career as conductor and music educator ==
From 1921 to 1927 he was the conductor of the St. Louis Symphony Orchestra and did much to raise it to the top rank of orchestras] As the fourth conductor of this orchestra Ganz was responsible for building and educating a new symphonic audience. The orchestra's first recordings, innovative children's and young people's concerts, as well as extensive spring tours to the Midwest, South, and Southwest were the sources for this new audience. During his six seasons twenty-one percent of the music presented comprised first St. Louis performances. They included Maurice Ravel's Rapsodie espagnole, Gustav Mahler's Symphony No. 4, Ottorino Respighi's Fountains of Rome, Ralph Vaughan Williams's London Symphony, Richard Strauss's A Hero's Life, Igor Stravinsky's Firebird Suite, Leo Sowerby's Suite From Northland, and Arthur Honegger's Pastorale d'été (American premiere). While in St. Louis, he was initiated as an honorary member of Phi Mu Alpha Sinfonia music fraternity in 1924 at the University of Missouri.

In 1928 he returned to teach at the Chicago Musical College, serving as its president from 1934 to 1954, but he continued to maintain a national presence. From 1930 to 1933 Ganz founded and conducted the National Little Symphony (renamed the National Chamber Symphony) sponsored by NBC to promote contemporary music. He led the Omaha Symphony Orchestra from 1936 to 1941. From 1939 to 1948 he was permanent conductor of the Young People's Concerts with the New York Philharmonic and San Francisco Symphony orchestras, and from 1944 to 1946, with the Chicago Symphony Orchestra. From 1946 to 1948, he was music director of the Grand Rapids Symphony in Grand Rapids, Michigan, which was a community orchestra at the time. On 20 February 1941, Ganz performed his own Piano Concerto in E-flat major, Op. 32, with the Chicago Symphony Orchestra under Frederick Stock, its world premiere. The work was commissioned by Frederick Stock for the fiftieth anniversary of the Chicago Symphony Orchestra. Most of Ganz's musical compositions are held at The Newberry Library.

== Legacy ==
Ganz was active in the promotion of new music throughout his career. Ferruccio Busoni, Christian Sinding, Charles Griffes, and Alexander Tcherepnin, among others, dedicated works to Ganz. In 1923 he received the Légion d'honneur of France for his introduction of the works of Claude Debussy and Ravel to American audiences, and in later years he performed and conducted pieces by Pierre Boulez, John Cage and Arthur Honegger. Ravel, in a letter to Ganz, expressed his gratitude for the pianist's interpretations of his music and, in appreciation, dedicated 'Scarbo'—the third movement of Gaspard de la Nuit—to him.

As late as the 1960s Ganz continued to pioneer new music. In 1961 Ganz edited fourteen early songs of Anton Webern that were published in three volumes by Carl Fischer, Inc. Earlier that year Hans Moldenhauer, Anton Webern scholar archivist at the University of Washington, and donor of the Moldenhauer Archives, had visited Ganz and his wife Esther LaBerge in Chicago. Moldenhauer, who was also a friend and former Ganz student, had just discovered a number of original manuscripts in the attic of the Webern home in Mittersill, Austria. Showing copies of the manuscripts to the Ganzes, he said, "Take whatever you want to perform." They selected fourteen songs written between 1899 and 1904 when Webern was sixteen to twenty years old. In May 1962, Ganz accompanied his wife Esther LaBerge, mezzo-soprano, in the world premiere of the early Anton Webern songs at the First International Webern Festival during the Seattle World's Fair.

Ganz's students during the 1930s and 1940s included John La Montaine (composer), Hans Moldenhauer, Joseph Bloch (pianist, Alkan scholar, and professor at The Juilliard School), Dorothy Donegan (jazz pianist), Edward Gordon (executive director of the Ravinia Festival), Wanda Paul (pianist and faculty member at Northwestern University), and Robert McDowell (pianist and faculty member at Chicago Musical College). Other students included Dean Sanders (Professor Emeritus, School of Music at the University of Illinois at Urbana-Champaign), Deniz Arman Gelenbe who is Professor of Piano and Head Emeritus of te Keyboard Department at the Trinity-Laban Conservatoire of Music and Dance in London, Audley Wasson, Marion Edna Hall, who taught for many years at the University of Indiana's Jacobs School of Music, Lucy Scarbrough (pianist and conductor), Abby Whiteside, Evelyn Hora, Gena Branscombe, Beatrice Sharp Karan, Evelyn (Wilgus) Lewis, Ilse Gerda Wunsch, Adrian Lerner Newman Goldman, Vera Bradford Arne Sorensen, Sheldon Shkolnik, Jeffrey Siegel, and Ludmila Lazar.

Ganz died in Chicago at the age of 95. A newspaper headline read, "A Last link with Liszt passes on".

== Family ==
Rudolph Ganz was the son of Rudolf Ganz, Sr., and Sophie Bartenfeld. He had three brothers: Paul, Emil, and Hans. Ganz married American soprano Mary Forrest in 1900, in Berlin. They had a son, Anton Roy Ganz, born in 1903, who later served as Swiss ambassador to the Soviet Union. After Mary Forrest Ganz died in 1956, Ganz married Esther LaBerge, who was a concert singer and associate professor of voice at Chicago Musical College, in 1959. Esther LaBerge Ganz had one daughter, Jeanne Colette Collester, a professor of art history. Esther LaBerge Ganz died in 2007.
