= Hilarius (poet) =

Latin poet (fl. 1125)

Hilarius, also known as Hilary the Englishman (fl. 1125), was a Latin poet who is supposed to have been an Englishman.

== Life ==
He was one of the pupils of Pierre Abélard at his oratory of the Paraclete, and addressed to him a copy of verses with its refrain in the vulgar tongue, "Tort avers vos li mestre", Abelard having threatened to discontinue his teaching because of certain reports made by his servant about the conduct of the scholars.

Later Hilarius may have made his way to Angers. His poems are contained in manuscript supp. lat. 1008 of the Bibliothèque Nationale, Paris, purchased in 1837 at the sale of M. de Rosny. Quotations from this manuscript had appeared before, but in 1838 it was edited by Champollion Figeac as Hilarii versus et ludi.

After 1125 there is no certain trace of him; he may be the same person as the Hilary who taught classical literature at Orléans, mentioned by William of Tyre and Arnulf of Orléans c. 1150, but it is unknown whether Hilarius of Orléans and Hilarius the playwright are separate people, nor if either of them are the same person as the Hilarius who taught at Angers.

== Works ==
His works consist chiefly of light verses of the goliardic type. There are verses addressed to an English nun named Eva, lines to Rosa, "Ave splendor puellarum, generosa domina", and another poem describes the beauties of the priory of Chaloutre la Petite, in the diocese of Sens, of which the writer was then an inmate. One copy of satirical verses seems to aim at the pope himself. Two other poems, originally translated by John Boswell and published in Christianity, Social Tolerance, and Homosexuality (1980), express his love for a 'Boy of Anjou' and 'An English boy'.

He also wrote three miracle plays in rhymed Latin with an ad-mixture of French. Two of them, Suscitatio Lazari and Historia de Daniel repraesentanda, are of purely liturgical type. At the end of Lazarus is a stage direction to the effect that if the performance has been given at matins, Lazarus should proceed with the Te Deum, if at vespers, with the Magnificat.

The third, Ludus super iconic Sancti Nicholai, is founded on a sufficiently foolish legend. Petit de Julleville sees in the play a satiric intention and a veiled incredulity that put the piece outside the category of liturgical drama.

A rhymed Latin account of a dispute in which the nuns of Ronceray at Angers were concerned, contained in a cartulary of Ronceray, is also ascribed to the poet, who there calls himself Hilarius Canonicus. The poem is printed in the Bibliothèque de l'Ecole des Chartes (vol. xxxvu. 1876), and was dated by Paul Marchegay from 1121.
