= Early Music New York =

- Origin: New York City, New York
- Genres: Early music
- Years active: 1974-present
- Labels: Ex Cathedra, Fonè Records, Lyrichord Discs, Nonesuch Records
- Website: www.earlymusicny.org

Early Music New York is a New York City-based early music group presented by the Early Music Foundation. The group's director and conductor is Frederick Renz.

== History ==
After his old early music band, New York Pro Musica, disbanded in 1974, Renz founded the Ensemble for Early Music, and founded the Grande Bande (also known as New York's Grande Bande of Original Instruments) as an offshoot of the Ensemble two years later. Both groups were affiliated with Renz's Early Music Foundation, which he had established in 1974. In 1992, the Ensemble for Early Music (also known as the New York Ensemble for Early Music and the New York's Ensemble for Early Music) had five members. It was renamed Early Music New York in 2002.
