= New York College of Music =

Music conservatory in Manhattan, New York

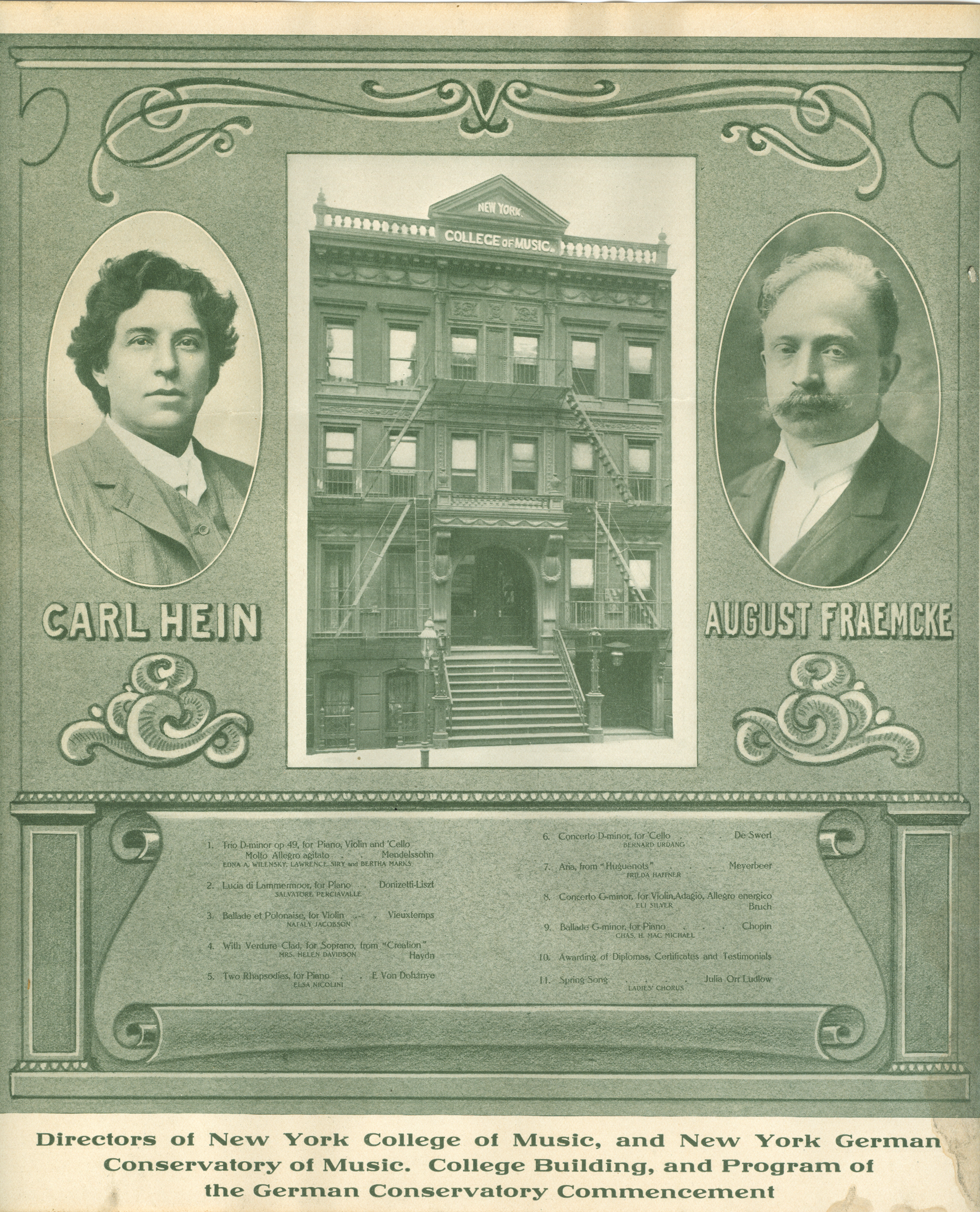
Carl Hein and August Fraemcke and NY College of Music Building

The New York College of Music was an American conservatory of music located in Manhattan that flourished from 1878 to 1968. The college was incorporated under the laws of New York and was empowered to confer diplomas and degrees ranging from a Bachelor of Music to a Doctor of Music. The conservatory was later repurposed after a merger with New York University and developed into the Music and Performing Arts Professions department of the Steinhardt School of Culture, Education, and Human Development.

== History ==
The New York College of Music was established in 1878 by Louis Alexander (1839–1903) and flourished for the next 90 years. Its first location was 163 East 70th Street. The faculty, around the time of its founding, included conductor Theodore Thomas and pianist Rafael Joseffy. Alexander Lambert (1862–1929), a pianist, served as the second director from 1887 to 1905. On September 1, 1891, he moved the college to a "handsome new building" at 128-130 East 58th Street. Faculty under Lambert included pianist Leopold Godowsky.

Later directors included Carl Hein (1864–1945) and August Fraemcke (1870–1933), who served as co-directors. In 1920, Hein and Fraemcke moved the college to its third and final home at 114–116 East 85th Street. At the death of Fraemcke in 1933, Hein carried on as director until his own death in 1945. Arved Kurtz (1899–1995) succeeded Hein and remained director until 1965. In 1965, Jerrold Ross (born 1935), became President of the College, the youngest in its history, and remained in the position until 1967.

Under Hein and Fraemcke, faculty included Hans Letz, who headed the violin department. He was one of the foremost musicians in the country. From 1912 to 1917 he was member of the Kneisel Quartet and later first violinist with the Letz Quartet. The piano department was under the direction of Fraemcke. Cornelius Rybner (de) in the mid 1920s, took the place of Rubin Goldmark as the head of the theory and composition department. The vocal department was under the direction of Carl Hein. William Ebann (1873–1945), principal cellist with the Philadelphia Orchestra from 1901 to 1902 and also cellist with the New York Philharmonic, headed the cello department for 45 years, until his death. Wilbur Luyster (1871–1949) was the director of the sight-singing department.

In 1920 the conservatory absorbed the German Conservatory and in 1923 it took over the American Conservatory. In 1958 the school presented the United States premiere of Benjamin Britten's The Turn of the Screw.

After nine decades of operation, the conservatory closed in June 1968 after a merger with New York University and be reinvented as the Steinhardt School. At the time of its closing, the New York College of Music was the oldest music conservatory in New York.

== Notable alumni ==
- Lil Hardin Armstrong, composer, onetime wife of Louis Armstrong
- Leonardo Balada, composer
- Cy Coleman, composer, songwriter, and jazz pianist
- Orpha-F. Deveaux, organist and pianist
- Jack Fina, bandleader, songwriter, and pianist
- Bob Griffiths, playwright, and organist
- Jerry Gonzalez, jazz trumpeter and percussionist
- Talib Rasul Hakim, composer
- Harley Hamilton, conductor, violinist, and composer
- Oswald Hoepfner, sculptor
- Lucy Kelston, operatic soprano
- Jerome Kern, musical theatre and popular music composer
- Karl Kohn, composer
- Barry Manilow, song writer, singer, pianist
- René McLean, saxophonist and flutist
- Sal Mosca, jazz pianist
- Charles Previn, film composer
- Cornelius L. Reid, vocal pedagogue
- James Sample, conductor
- Mordecai Sandberg, composer
- Alvin Singleton, composer
- Alan Silva, jazz bassist
- Ferdinand Sorenson, cellist, conductor, and composer
- Rose Stelle-Pourtet, soprano
- Cecil Taylor, jazz pianist
- Fred Weinberg, composer
- Margaret Jones Wiles, composer
- Ilse Gerda Wunsch, composer

== Awards and honorary degrees ==
New York College of Music Medal

- 1932 – Richard Strauss, composer

Honorary Doctor of Music

- 1945 – Anders Emile, composer and professor at Hunter College
- 1946 – Philip James, composer, conductor, educator
- 1949 – Jan Peerce, opera tenor
- 1953 – Walter Piston, composer
- 1954 – Marion Bauer, composer
- 1955 – Peter Wilhousky, composer
- 1956 – Wilfrid Pelletier, conductor
- 1956 – Julius Preuver (de), conductor

== Notable faculty ==
- Hubert de Blanck, pianist and composer
- Marion Bauer, composer
- Paul Creston, composer
- Ania Dorfmann, pianist
- Emanuel Feuermann, cellist
- Leopold Godowsky, pianist and composer
- Rubin Goldmark, theory and composition
- D. Antoinette Handy, flautist and music scholar
- William James Henderson, musical critic and scholar
- Rafael Joseffy, pianist
- Erich Katz, musicologist
- Edgar Stillman Kelley, composer, conductor, and writer on music
- Hans Kronold, cellist and composer
- Siegfried Landau, conductor and composer
- Frederic Lillebridge, pianist and composer
- Vladimir Padwa, composer and pianist
- Clara Poole King, contralto
- Vittorio Rieti, composer
- Cornelius Rybner (de), theory and composition
- Mordecai Sandberg, composer
- Theodore Thomas, conductor
- Jacob Weinberg, composer and pianist
- Stefan Wolpe, composer

== Bibliographic collections ==
- Vladimir Padwa Collection at the Peabody Conservatory
- Correspondence: with Marian Anderson (1965); OCLC 63560441
- "Reminiscences of Otto Herz" (oral history; 1975); OCLC 122513671
- "Erich Katz Collection, 1918–2007;" OCLC 434502464
- "Interview with Isaac Nemiroff (1974); OCLC 664381109
