= Erich Katz =

German-born musician, composer, critic and professor (1900–1973)

Erich Katz (July 31, 1900 – July 30, 1973) was a German-born musicologist, composer, music critic, musician and professor. He fled the Nazis in 1939, arriving first in England, emigrating to the United States in 1943, where he became a citizen. He was a driving force behind the early music and recorder movements in the United States. Bernard Krainis, a co-founder of New York Pro Musica studied with Katz.

== Biographical details ==
Katz was born into a prosperous Jewish family in Posen, then part of Prussia, now Poznań, Poland. His father was Albert Katz, a jeweler and watchmaker, the son of a baker. His mother was Grete Katz (née Schmerl).

In 1907, the family moved to Berlin, Germany. In 1918, Katz completed eight weeks of basic training just before the Armistice was signed, ending World War I.

Katz initially began studying engineering, but switched to music after one semester. He was educated at the Stern Conservatory and the Berlin Hochschule für Musik. He studied at the University of Berlin from 1918 to 1921 and then moved to Freiburg im Breisgau, where and studied with Wilibald Gurlitt at the University of Freiburg. He wrote his dissertation on 17th century music and received his doctorate in 1926.

Katz was married to Adelheid Soltau, who was not Jewish, in 1926. In 1928, he co-founded the Freiburger Kurse für Musiktheorie and became its co-director. During this time, Katz also worked as a choral conductor, organist and music critic. He also edited Das neue Chorbuch, published in Mainz in 1931. The Freiburg Kurse later became known as the Freiburg Music Seminary and Katz remained its director until 1933, when the Nazis seized power and began restricting the employment rights of Jews.

Until 1938, Katz was able to continue his other work as a music teacher, organist, composer and music critic, writing for such musical periodicals as Melos and the Austrian magazine, Musikblätter des Anbruch. As the situation became more difficult, his wife left him and Katz went into hiding. He was soon arrested, however, and was sent to Dachau concentration camp. At this point, the Nazis were releasing a number of prisoners, provided they left Germany immediately. In 1939, Katz fled Nazi Germany with his daughter, Hanna, and went to England. Katz's wife kept their son, Klaus. (Note: Their third child had died in infancy.)

Katz worked at night as a fireman on the roof of a factory and during the day, he gave concerts in London churches, until they were bombed in the Blitz. In 1940, the British government, fearing a "fifth column", rounded up all "enemy aliens", all German-speaking males over the age of 16 and some females, including many who had fled Nazism. Katz was also interned. In 1940, while still interned, he married his second wife, Hannah Labus, with guards acting as witnesses. On release from internment in 1941, Katz began working at Bunce Court School, which had been evacuated to Wem in Shropshire from its original home in Otterden, Kent. Katz remained at Bunce Court until they received permission to emigrate to the United States in 1943.

Arriving via Canada with $3 and the clothes on their backs, his wife took a job as a night nurse, Katz copied music and his daughter painted vases. That same year, Katz became the music director of the American Recorder Society (ARS). In 1944, Katz became a professor of composition at the New York College of Music, later becoming chairman of the department. He also taught at the New School for Social Research and City College. Katz also directed the New York Musician's Workshop, a group of singers and instrumentalists which performed early and contemporary music. Most of those in the group were students of his from the college. He reorganized ARS in 1947 and remained its music director until 1959.

His classes were influential for many students. His music history class was described as including not just discussion and listening, but students also performed the music, better enabling them to learn about the music. His harmony and composition classes were described as equally inspiring and beneficial. Student LaNoue Davenport wrote, "Being educated by [Katz] involved not only a verbal-intellectual process, but the body and spirit as well." He was friends with composers Carl Orff and Paul Hindemith and his own compositions, particularly of chamber and choral music, were influenced by their music.

Between 1947 and 1952, he corresponded with Hermann Hesse. In 1959, Katz moved to Santa Barbara, California, where he worked at the Santa Barbara City College until his death in 1973.

== Personal ==
He and his second wife had a son, Michael, in 1946. His wife was a psychiatrist and they lived in Cornwall-on-Hudson, New York and his daughter, Hanna, was married and went to Puerto Rico. She had one son, Rene (Chris) Mosquera. A loyal friend and correspondent, Katz remained in contact with his first wife and their son. Katz also had a long friendship with Carl Orff, although Orff remained in Germany during the Third Reich and ultimately found favor with the Nazi cultural establishment.

Katz became a naturalized American citizen.

== Awards and legacy ==
Katz received the International Hausermann Composition Prize in Zurich, Switzerland in 1936. He influenced hundreds of performers and teachers and he arranged and wrote music for the recorder and other instruments, as well as for voice, writing hundreds of manuscripts. Katz was called "the true father of the recorder movement in [the United States]" and a "seminal figure".

Katz' personal papers are archived in the Erich Katz Collection at the Recorder Music Center, Archives and Special Collections, Regis University. The American Recorder Society has an Erich Katz Memorial Fund, which holds a composition contest.

=== Notable students ===
- Bernard Krainis
- Ilse Gerda Wunsch

== Publications and recordings (selected list) ==
- "In the Beginning", American Recorder XIX/4 (February 1979), pp. 155–156
- Recorder Folk Songs (Minus Flute), (Audio CD) Traditions Alive, LLC (April 2011) ASIN B004K3L2IC
