= Edward Ballantine =

American composer

Edward Ballantine (August 6, 1886 – July 2, 1971), was an American composer and professor of music.

== Early life ==
Edward Ballantine was born in Oberlin, Ohio, on August 6, 1886, the son of William Gay Ballantine, the fourth president of Oberlin College, and Emma Frances Atwood. One brother, Arthur Atwood, was the senior member of the New York law firm of Root, Clark, Buckner & Ballantine—later Dewey, Ballantine, Bushby, Palmer & Wood. Another brother, Henry Winthrop, was Professor of Law, at Boalt Hall School of Law.

== Education and career ==
He studied with Walter Spalding and Frederick Converse at Harvard University, where he received a BA in 1907. He was awarded highest final honors in music at Harvard University and an orchestral composition of his was played by the Boston Symphony Orchestra at Boston, Massachusetts, on June 14, 1907. He then pursued his studies with Artur Schnabel, Rudolf Ganz, and Philippe Rüferthen in Berlin from 1907 to 1909. He returned to the United States where he joined the Harvard music faculty in 1912, where he remained until his retirement in 1947. His best-known compositions are two sets of piano variations on "Mary Had a Little Lamb" (1924, 1943), in which each variation is in the style of a different composer.

== Marriage ==
In 1923 he married, as her second husband, Florence Foster Besse, a childhood friend and the daughter of Henrietta Louisa Segee and Lyman W. Besse, who owned an extensive chain of clothing stores in the Northeast known as "The Besse System". She was a 1907 Phi Beta Kappa graduate of Wellesley College. She had married as her first husband, Kingman Brewster, Sr. They separated in 1923 and were later divorced. They were the parents of Kingman Brewster, Jr., who was an educator, diplomat, and president of Yale University.

== Death ==
He died on July 2, 1971, at his home at Vineyard Haven, Massachusetts.
