= Vladimir Padwa =

American musician

Vladimir Padwa (February 8, 1900 – April 28, 1981) was an American pianist, composer, and educator.

== Biography ==
He was born at the Krivyakino Estate in the Russian Empire (now part of Voskresensk), the son of Mikhail and Maria (Schneidmann) Padwa. He was raised in Estonia, then a territory of Imperial Russia, and he received Estonian citizenship in 1918, when Estonia became an independent country. He married Alexandra Niedas of Tallinn in 1927. The couple resided in London and Berlin before coming to the United States in 1932. Their daughter Tatiana was born in 1933. The family settled in New York City and later lived in Woodstock, New York, from 1935 to 1946. Padwa and Alexandra divorced in 1946, and he married Natalie Joy Lozier (1926–1986)) on 18 December 1947 in Stamford, Connecticut. Their son Thomas was born in 1953. Padwa became a U.S. citizen in 1948, and from that year made his home in New York City.

== Career ==
He was educated at the conservatories of St. Petersburg, Berlin, and Leipzig, receiving the Matura degree from Leipzig in 1924. In 1917, at the age of 17, he was also co-founder of the State Conservatory of Music in Tallinn, Estonia.

He was the last pupil of Ferruccio Busoni in Berlin and then studied with Busoni’s master pupil Michael Zadora. He gave concerts throughout Europe, and in collaboration with the Neo-Bechstein company, he was director of and a performer in the first broadcast of all-electronic music from Berlin, in 1932. Padwa’s collaboration with Bechstein resulted in 1932 in a six-month contract with Radio-Keith Orpheum (RKO) and the Radio City Theaters to perform in America on the Bechstein electric piano as part of the Inaugural Roxy radio broadcast from Radio City Music Hall in New York City on November 13, 1932. Before ending his contract in 1933, he performed regularly in radio broadcasts and gave the first live solo piano broadcast of electronic music in the U.S.

His concert career included a seven-year association as accompanist to violinist Mischa Elman, with whom he made four successful world tours to five continents from 1934 to 1940. In the 1930s and 1940s Padwa also participated in the Maverick Concert Hall music series in Woodstock, New York. In 1940 he was musical director of the Woodstock Playhouse Concerts.

In 1941, along with pianists Adam Garner, Frank Mittler, and Edward Edson, he founded the nationally acclaimed First Piano Quartet. The FPQ was heard regularly on radio and recorded for RCA Victor.

He became a professor of music at the New York College of Music in 1948, and he was named chairman of the piano department in 1967. In 1968, the College of Music merged with New York University, where he became an associate professor of music education. After 1948 he spent his summers composing at the Vermont Toy Farm in Essex Junction, Vermont.

In 1958 he was made an honorary member of the Accademia Internazionale Di Roma.

During the 1960s and 1970s he was an adjudicator for the New Brunswick Competitive Festival of Music and Quebec Music Festivals, for whom he was commissioned to write piano pieces to be used in sight reading competitions.

Thiel College awarded him an honorary doctorate in music in 1978.

He composed music for a wide range of instruments and was a member of the American Society of Composers, Authors and Publishers, from which he received the Standard Panel Awards annually from 1968 to 1980.

Padwa maintained a full teaching and performing schedule to the end of his life.

A collection of his music and papers is maintained at the music library of the Peabody Institute of the Johns Hopkins University in Baltimore, Maryland, in the United States.
