= Mordecai Sandberg =

Romanian composer

Mordecai (Markus) Sandberg (Hebrew: מרדכי זנדברג) (February 4, 1897 – December 28, 1973) was a composer and physician. He was a creative and prolific composer, a musical theorist, and an innovative physician in the area of alternative and natural medicine in 1920s and 1930s Jerusalem.

Sandberg was a pioneer in the field of microtonal theory and music. He believed that a microtonal system of music could be the basis of making “a music of humanity” that would bring people together from all cultures and transcend local traditions. He argued that although there seemed to be a conflict between the western and eastern tonal systems, there was in reality one music and one humanity. He developed his Universal Tonal System, a synthesis of oriental and occidental scales using microtones. He also designed several instruments and a notation system for microtonal music.

As a composer of microtonal music Sandberg intended to translate and interpret the sacred texts of all the worlds’ religions to musical form. He began his monumental project with the Hebrew Bible, from his own European Jewish tradition. He theorized that microtonal music, incorporating the tonal traditions of Asia, was an appropriate means for setting Hebrew, an Oriental language, to music. Over the course of his life, Sandberg produced some twenty thousand pages of musical composition. His magnum opus was Symphonic Psalms, the setting of the Book of Psalms to music, a task which comprised more than twelve thousand pages of composition.

== Early life ==
Sandberg was born in the town of Hârlău but grew up in Suceava in Bukovina, a province of what was then the Austro-Hungarian empire. Sandberg studied medicine at the University of Vienna, during World War I, under such professors as Julius Tandler, a well known academic and political figure in Vienna at the time. While pursuing a medical education, Sandberg informally studied music. It was during this time that he began his earliest surviving creative work, Demosthenes, a play and later an overture which was completed in 1925. Although his studies were interrupted because of the war, Sandberg graduated from the University of Vienna in 1921 as a medical doctor.

=== Move to Jerusalem ===
After World War I, Austria ended its control over the city of Suceava, and in 1922 Sandberg moved to Jerusalem in the British Mandate of Palestine. There he opened a medical clinic utilizing alternative medical techniques, including vitamin and herbal therapies, diet change, and spiritual healing. His patients ran the spectrum of people living in the Palestine, and beyond, and he journeyed at times to Egypt to care for patients using his alternative techniques. As part of his practice of medicine he authored The Way of Spiritual Healing according to the Jewish Tradition (1939), a book published in Hebrew.

While working as a medical doctor in Palestine, Sandberg’s pursued his passion for music and he was active as a composer. In 1924, Sandberg began composing music to the Book of Psalms. In 1925, Sandberg’s musical composition, Kohelet (Ecclesiastes) was performed in Jerusalem. In 1926, he founded the Palestine Musicians Association together with composers Jacob Weinberg and Solomon Rosowsky. In 1926, Sandberg, married the painter, Hannah Rosner. In 1927, he was one of the founders of the Palestine section of the International Society for Contemporary Music. In the same year, he organized concerts for his own works and that of German composer Willi von Moellendorff in Jerusalem and Tel-Aviv; he lectured on the quarter tone system in Palestinian music in Tel-Aviv and offered courses in ear training to performers and composers.

In 1928 Sandberg presented a concert in Jerusalem of his own works and those of Arnold Schoenberg. In 1929 he arranged concerts of his works in Germany and published a paper on his theory of microtonal music entitled, “Die Musik der Menschheit: Die Ton-Differenzierung und ihre Bedeutung” at the Hochschule für Musik in Berlin. He also designed a harmonium with 12th and 16th tones. In 1930, he founded the Hebrew monthly magazine, Hallel which included photographs of some instruments of his design.

In 1938, Sandberg took part in an international conference on music and art in London. His lecture on microtonal music was later broadcast on the BBC. After the conference, he organized a number of concerts, broadcasts, and lectures of his work in England. The BBC program planner and advocate of contemporary music Edward Clark said that Sandberg was "a composer in whose path new music is following".

Sandberg himself settled in the United States after the outset of World War II, later bringing his family to New York City following the end of the war. In 1939, he offered a number of lectures in music in New York including one on radio station WEVD about the “Problems of Palestinian Music”. In 1940, he taught a course at the New York College of Music on the subject of microtonal music. Over the next few years, concerts of his music were performed at Carnegie Hall, on radio station WCBS-FM, and at New York's Town Hall.

In 1949, Sandberg’s works Eskerah ("I remember") and Ruth were performed at Town Hall. The former was begun in 1938 in memory of those who were suffering persecution at the hands of the Nazis in Germany, but it was completed after the war when the full extent of the destruction of World War II became known.

Over the next twenty years, Sandberg devoted his time to composing musical settings for the entire Bible. In 1970, he moved to Toronto, Ontario, Canada, where he obtained a position as a teaching fellow at Stong College, York University. He died in Toronto on December 28, 1973.

== Performances ==
In recent years, Sandberg's music has been performed by the American Festival of Microtonal Music. In 1999, Sandberg's Psalm 51 was performed with soloist Dutch soprano Dorien Verheijden.

== Recordings ==
Mordecai Sandberg: Chamber Works: Music composed between 1938 and 1948, performed by Adele Armin, James Wallenberg, Laura Wilcox, Richard Armin, Stephen Clarke and Marc Sabat. Recorded at York University.

== Selected works ==
- Demosthenes (overture) (1925, unpublished)
- Koheleth I (Ecclesiastes), for violin and pianoforte (1925) Symphony no. 1 (1925)
- Four Little Preludes, for pianoforte (1925–1929, unpublished)
- Elohai Neshama, for three flutes, English horn, and bass clarinet (1926, unpublished)
- Sonata no. 1, quarter-tone hymn (1927)
- Symphony no. 2 (1928)
- The Vision of Isaiah, for baritone solo and organ (1934)
- Elisha, Fantasy, for violin and pianoforte (1938)
- Sim Shalom, for five tenors, baritone solo, list and organ (1938)
- Ezkerah (I Remember) (oratorio), for soprano, alto, tenor, and bass and orchestra (1938–1952)
- Symphony no. 5 (1939–1953)
- Orah no. 2, for violin and pianoforte (1940)
- Shelosh Esrei Midot (The Thirteen Attributes), for baritone solo and organ (1940)
- String Quartet no. 1 (1941)
- Tel-Aviv, for violin and pianoforte (1941)
- The Five Points, for orchestra (1942)
- Concerto, for clarinet and strings (1943)
- Hymn, Aria, Dance, for clarinet and pianoforte (1943)
- Palestinian, Suite for violoncello and microtonal organ (1943)
- Sonata, for pianoforte (1943–1946)
- Symphony no. 4 (1944–1959)
- Ezekiel 34, for violin and quarter-tone organ (1945)
- Orah no. 3, for string quartet (1945)
- The Song of Songs (Sonata no. 3), for violin (1945)
- Three Sonatas, for violin (1945–1948)
- A Little Palestinian New Year’s Festival:
1. Zeman Simhatheinu (The Season of Our Gladness; a Sukkot song), for baritone solo and pianoforte;
2. In Thy Pavilion, O Eternal (Psalm 15);
3. Happy Is Everyone Who Reveres the Eternal (Psalm 128);
4. Orah “Elul”:
  1. (I Am My Beloved’s and My Beloved Is Mine), for violin, violoncello, and pianoforte;
  2. for soprano, alto, tenor, and bass and pianoforte;
5. Kaddish, for violoncello or trombone and pianoforte (1946)
- Sonata no. 6 in C, for bichromatic organ (1946)
- Orah, for orchestra (1947)
- Jerusalem (hymn), for violin and pianoforte (1948)
- Sonata in A, for pianoforte (1948)
- Three Sonatas, for viola (1948)
- Symphony no. 3 (1948–1953)
- Psalm 130, for English horn and pianoforte (1949)
- Quintet (The Five Points), for string quartet and pianoforte (1951)
- Sextet, for clarinet, string quartet, and pianoforte (1951)
- Symphonic Psalms, for soprano, alto, tenor, and bass and orchestra: vol. 1, Psalms 1–5; vol. 2, Psalms 6–10; vol. 14, Psalms 120–135 (1951–1955)
- Psalm settings, 625 items (unpublished)
- Settings of other biblical texts, seventy-six items
- Liturgical texts, fifty-six items

== Published compositions ==
- Symphonic Psalms: the original text of the book of Psalms, set to music in its entirety, in 15 volumes (1951)
- The Visions of Isaiah - for Baritone, Voice and Organ
- Prayer for Peace - For Soprano, Tenor, Baritone and Organ (or Piano)
- "The Lord, The Lord.." - for Baritone and Organ (or Piano)
- Koheleth (Ecclesiastes) - for Voice and Piano
- Tel-Aviv - for Voice and Piano
- Elisha (Fantasy) for Violin and Piano
- Ezkerah: I remember: Oratorio published in New York by the Institute for New Music (1953)
- A Little Palestinian New Year's Festival published by the Institute of New Music Jerusalem/New York (1946)
- Sextet: for clarinet, two violins, viola cello and piano in 3 movements (1951)
- The song of songs: Sonata no. 3 for violin solo
- Zeman Simchatenu (the Season of our Gladness): a Succoth song: for baritone and piano
- The Eternal has consoled his people, he has freed Jerusalem: hymn, for viola or voice, and piano or orchestra, New York; Jerusalem: Institute of New Music (1948)
- Orah "Elul" (I am my beloved and my beloved is mine): for violin cello and piano

== Instruments ==
In 1926, J. Straube (Harmoniumfabrik Straube, Berlin) built a Bichromatic Quartertone Harmonium specifically for Mordecai Sandberg. The harmonium has white keys which sound the whole tones and black keys for the half tones and brown keys to render the quarter tones. This harmonium is now in the museum at York University, Toronto, Ontario, Canada.

== Articles ==
- Tafkid Hamusika Bevinyan Haaretz (The purpose of the music in the erection of the land) published in "Hallel No.1, Jerusalem, 1930 p.23
- Die Tondifferenzierung und ihre Bedeutung, Leipzig: Kistner & Siegel, 1930

== Sources ==
- Austin Clarkson, Karen Pegley and Jay Rahn, Mordecai Sandberg: A Catalogue of his Music, Musica Judaica, Vol. 13 (5755/1993-94), pp. 18–81
- C. Heller: Mordecai Sandberg: his Compositions and his Ideas, Journal of Synagogue Music, xiv/1 (1984), 9-26
- J. Mandelbaum: Mordecai Sandberg, Musica Judaica, x/1 (1987-8), 81-91
- R. Brotbeck: Volkerverbinderde Tondifterenzierwng: Mordecai Sandberg-ein verkanter Pionier der Mikrotonalit Neuezeitschrift fur Musik (1991), 38-44
