= Play of Daniel (TV play) =

- Ad from SMH 13 Dec 1961
- Based on: Play of Daniel
- Directed by: Colin Dean
- Country of origin: Australia
- Original language: English

Production
- Running time: 60 mins
- Production company: ABC

Original release
- Network: ABC
- Release: 13 December 1961 (Sydney, live)
- Release: 25 December 1961 (Melbourne, Brisbane, taped)

Play of Daniel is a 1961 Australian TV play based on Play of Daniel. It was broadcast from the crypt of St Mary's Cathedral in Sydney.

The performance was edited by Noah Greenberg with narration by W.H. Auden.

Australian TV drama was relatively rare at the time.

== Plot ==
In Babylon at the time of King Belshazzar, writing on the wall warns the prophet Daniel about the destruction that will accompany the arrival of Darius, leader of the Medes and the Persians. The counsellor turns King Darius against Daniel.

== Cast ==
- Richard Connolly as Daniel
- Stewart Ogilvie as Prince
- John Brosnan as Darius
- James Condon as Narrator
- Anne Della-Bosca as Queen
- Robert Moore as Belshazzar
- Robyn Hannon
- John Robertson

== Production ==
The play, directed by James Lang, was presented at St Mary's Crypt in August 1961 by the Guild of St Pius X. The production was revived in November.

The ABC decided to do a live broadcast of the play which aired in December 1961. The play was set entirely to music.

== See also ==
- List of television plays broadcast on Australian Broadcasting Corporation (1960s)
