= Bob Griffiths (writer) =

American dramatist

Bob Griffiths (Henry Robert Griffiths) (born April 16, 1938) is an author, playwright, and professional speaker.

Born in Brooklyn, New York, Griffiths majored in Organ at New York College of Music before switching to New York University, where he received a B.S. in Finance.

Griffiths' first play was professionally produced in 1992. Three years later, he was commissioned to write and direct three plays about leading writers of the 1930s by Bucks County Center for the Performing Arts. In 2001, Griffith's Do What You Love for the Rest of Your Life: A Practical Guide to Career Change and Personal Renewal was published by Ballantine Books.

Griffiths is an active (Professional) Member of the Dramatists Guild, the Authors Guild, and the Episcopal Actors Guild of America. He also serves as Chaplain at the Pines of Sarasota senior living facility, and retreat leader spiritual director at the Associate of the Order of the Holy Cross.
