= Ilse Gerda Wunsch =

Ilse Gerda Wunsch (December 14, 1911 – October 8, 2003) was an American composer, pianist, teacher, and choral conductor who was born in Germany.

Wunsch was born in Berlin, where she began her studies in piano with Franz Osborn and in music pedagogy with Maria Leo. She immigrated to the United States in 1938 and received her M.M. degree from the Chicago Music College. Wunsch studied piano with Rudolf Ganz, composition with Max Wald, and counterpoint with Erich Katz. She taught at the New York College of Music from 1948 to 1968 and at the Stern College for Women, Yeshiva University from 1960 to 1964. When the New York College of Music became New York University in 1968, Wunsch continued teaching as an associate professor of music education there. She was the organist and choir director at Temple Beth-El in Cedarhurst, New York, from 1949 to 1968.

Wunsch was married to Max Janowski from 1934 to 1946. She married Otto Mainzer in 1966.

== Publications ==
=== Autobiography (in German) ===
Zurück nach vorn. Mein Leben mit Prometheus. Stroemfeld / Roter Stern, Frankfurt am Main / Basel 1998, ISBN 3-87877-574-1.

=== Articles ===
- "Brainwriting in the Theory Class: The Importance of Perception in Taking Dictation" (Music Educators Journal vol 60 no 1 September 1973)
- "Improvisation. . . How?" (American Music Teacher vol 21 no 6 1972)

== Compositions ==
- Sabbath Morning Service (text by Rabbi Edward T. Sandrow, for unison or two-part chorus and solo voice with organ or piano accompaniment; 1956)
- Sacred Songs
- Twelve Progressing Tone Plays (for piano; 1972)
- Young Faith (Sabbath evening service; text by Rabbi Edward T. Sandrow, for unison or two-part chorus and solo voice with organ or piano accompaniment; 1956)
