= Bernard Krainis =

American recorder player

- Born: Bernard Krainis; December 28, 1924; New Brunswick, New Jersey, U.S.
- Died: August 18, 2000 (aged 75) Great Barrington, Massachusetts, U.S.
- Genres: Early music, classical
- Occupations: Recorder performer; musicologist; professor
- Years active: 1952–1985
- Labels: Esoteric Records, Decca, MCA, Columbia, Melodya
- Formerly of: Noah Greenberg, New York Pro Musica, Russell Oberlin, Aston Magna

Bernard Krainis (1924-2000) was an American musician and co-founder of New York Pro Musica. He played recorder and studied with Erich Katz.

He was a founding member of the New York Pro Musica Antiqua and the Aston Magna Foundation for Music, two pioneering ensembles for the performance of early music on period instruments. He died at age 75 on August 18, 2000, at his home in Great Barrington, Massachusetts. According to his family, the cause of death was cancer.

== Early years ==
Krainis was born in New Brunswick, New Jersey, on December 28, 1924, the son of Abraham and Rose Sachs Krainis. During World War II he served in the Army, stationed in India with the Seventh Bomber Group. He attended Denver University. But it was his studies at New York University, where he was a student of the medieval and Renaissance music scholar Gustave Reese, that determined the future course of his life.

== Music career ==
In 1952, along with the conductor and musicologist Noah Greenberg, Krainis formed the New York Pro Musica Antiqua, which brought wider public attention to early music and was in the forefront of the period-instrument movement. Krainis performed with the group until 1959. In the 1960s he organized and toured with his own ensembles: the Krainis Baroque Trio, the Krainis Baroque Ensemble and the Krainis Consort, becoming one of the few recorder players at the time to have a prominent solo career. He also acted as first president of the New York Recorder Guild.

In the early 1970s he was a founding member of Aston Magna, which is still a force in the revival of early music, presenting concerts and sponsoring an important summer music festival at its headquarters in Great Barrington, where Krainis moved in 1969.

In 1985, at 60, he retired as a performer. But he remained active as a board member and teacher at Aston Magna. He also taught at Kirkland College, Columbia University, the Eastman School of Music and Smith College.

Krainis is survived by his wife, Betty; a son, John, of Freeport, Maine; a stepson, David H. Lippman of Great Barrington; two stepdaughters, Deborah Morris of Great Barrington and Judith Grant of Chapel Hill, North Carolina; a sister, Esther James of Freeland, Washington; and nine grandchildren.

Though he was a specialist in early music, Krainis had wide-ranging musical interests. His friend Andrew L. Pincus, the music critic of The Berkshire Eagle, recalled in a recent tribute that Krainis could frequently be seen at the yearly Tanglewood Festival of Contemporary Music in Lenox, Massachusetts, and that his assessments of new works were insightful. "He had perfect pitch for both quality and cant," Mr. Pincus wrote, "and could be merciless in his judgments of fakery."

== See also ==
- New York Recorder Guild
