= Play of Daniel =

Medieval Latin liturgical dramas

- Original title: Ludus Danielis
- Original language: Latin
- Written by: Hilarius
- Based on: Book of Daniel

Premiere
- Date: c. 1140

Play of Daniel
- Original title: Ludus Danielis
- Original language: Latin
- Written by: students at Beauvais Cathedral
- Based on: Book of Daniel
- Music by: students at Beauvais Cathedral

Premiere
- Date: c. 1140

The Play of Daniel, or Ludus Danielis, is either of two medieval Latin liturgical dramas based on the biblical Book of Daniel, one of which is accompanied by monophonic music.

== Surviving plays ==
The play itself dates from c. 1140. Two medieval plays of Daniel survive. The first version is in a manuscript conserved in the French National Library (Lat 11331); the text is by Hilarius, and no music accompanies it. The second version is a 13th-century drama with monophonic music, written about 1227 to 1234 by students at the school of Beauvais Cathedral, located in northern France. A large portion of the text is poetic rather than strictly liturgical in origin; it closely follows the narrative of the biblical story of Daniel at the court of Belshazzar.

== Modern revivals ==
In the United States, the latter play was revived in the 1950s by Noah Greenberg, director of the New York Pro Musica; a commentary in English, written and performed by W. H. Auden, was used in some of their performances. A recorded 1958 performance by the group at The Cloisters of the Metropolitan Museum of Art, and featuring boy choristers of the Church of the Transfiguration as satraps and soldiers, was released by Decca, with sleeve notes by Paul Henry Lang and Dom Rembert Weakland, O.S.B., who had discovered the text at the British Library. Since the New York Pro Musica production it has enjoyed many performances among early music troupes.

Also important in the history of modern revivals of the Beauvais Cathedral version, Daniel was the 1985 production of the Boston Camerata, staged by Andrea von Ramm, with musical direction by Joel Cohen. In 2008, The Dufay Collective and William Lyons released their CD, The Play of Daniel on the Harmonia Mundi usa label. A new production of the Play of Daniel by the Boston Camerata, this time under the direction of French-born medievalist Anne Azéma, was presented in Boston in November, 2014. Daniel was played by tenor Jordan Weatherston Pitts.

In 2008, a new production, staged by Drew Minter with musical direction by Mary Anne Ballard in commemoration of the 50th anniversary of the noted Cloisters production of 1958, was created, also at the Cloisters. The show has been reprised in subsequent seasons, in 2012 at the Cloisters and in 2013 and 2014 as part of the Twelfth Night Festival at Trinity Church Wall Street.

== Characters ==
- Belshazzar's Prince
- Belshazzar
- Two Wise Men
- Three Envious Counselors
- Habakkuk
- Belshazzar's Queen
- Daniel
- Darius the Mede
- Two Advisors
- An angel
- Herald Angel
- Satraps and soldiers

== Adaptations ==
It was adapted for Australian TV in 1961.

== Recordings ==
- The Dufay Collective: The Play of Daniel - harmonia mundi usa, 2008
- The Harp Consort: Ludus Danielis. Dir. Andrew Lawrence-King - Deutsche Harmonia Mundi, 1998
- New York's Ensemble for Early Music: Ludus Danielis. Dir. Renz Frederick - Foné Ita, 1996
- Ensemble Venance Fortunat: Daniel - Opéra sacré. Dir. Anne-Marie Deschamps - L'Empreinte Digitale, 1996
- New York Pro Musica: The Play of Daniel - Decca, 1958
