= Russell Oberlin =

American opera singer

Russell Keys Oberlin (October 11, 1928 – November 25, 2016) was an American singer and founding member of the New York Pro Musica Antiqua ensemble who became the first, and for years the only, countertenor in the United States to attain general recognition—in The New Yorker's words, "America's first star countertenor." A pioneering figure in the early music revival in the 1950s and 1960s, Oberlin sang on both sides of the Atlantic, and brought a "full, warm, vibrato-rich tone" to his recitals, recordings, and his performances in works ranging from the thirteenth-century liturgical drama The Play of Daniel to the twentieth-century opera A Midsummer Night's Dream.

== Life and career ==
Russell Oberlin was born in 1928 in Akron, Ohio. He sang professionally as a child, and studied at the Juilliard School of Music in New York from 1948 to 1951, beginning a career as a tenor even before his graduation.

In 1952, he was a founding member of the New York Pro Musica Antiqua, with which he appeared as soloist in medieval and Renaissance repertory, initially as a "high tenor" but soon taking over alto parts, as his unusual vocal range came to light. He sang regularly with the ensemble through 1959, and made later appearances as a guest soloist. Oberlin was featured in the roles of Belshazzar's Prince and the Herald Angel in Pro Musica's acclaimed restoration of the medieval liturgical drama with music The Play of Daniel, first presented at The Cloisters in January 1958, and was in the subsequent recording as well as a 1965 public television version which became an annual Christmas telecast. "Accompanied by the centuries-old instruments Noah Greenberg had assembled," as George Birnbaum recalled, "I suspect that many people—myself included—date their personal entry into this strange Gothic sound world from the moment they heard Russell Oberlin's distinctive, plangent voice singing in a range which Björling or Pavarotti could never attempt."

The Play of Daniel "galvanized the early-music movement in the U.S. and made a star out of the countertenor Russell Oberlin," The New Yorker recounted. Oberlin became, as Peter G. Davis wrote, "for many years the lone practitioner of any note" of "a voice type that had never flourished in America before." Oberlin described himself as a countertenor whose "naturally high tenor voice" allowed him to sing the countertenor repertoire without using falsetto. "At a time when the term 'countertenor' suggested a 'churchy' English sound," wrote Ira Siff in Opera News, "the rich, beautiful (and not vibrato-free) voice of Russell Oberlin created a welcome alternative for lovers of early and baroque music ... Oberlin altered public perceptions and expanded possibilities for today's countertenors."

Oberlin was engaged by Leonard Bernstein for his 1955 recording of Handel's Messiah. He sang the role of Oberon (created by Alfred Deller at the Aldeburgh Festival) in the Covent Garden premiere of Britten's A Midsummer Night's Dream, conducted by Georg Solti, in 1961, as well as the opera's North American premiere in Vancouver, Canada, and its U.S. premiere at San Francisco Opera the same year. Bernstein wrote a part for him in his Chichester Psalms (1965). He recorded extensively (including albums of songs by Dowland and Purcell and arias by Handel), gave recitals and appeared as soloist with leading orchestras in the US and abroad.

At the age of 36, he retired from active engagements to become a teacher, joining the faculty at Hunter College in New York as Professor of Music, where he served from 1966 to 1994. As a senior Fulbright research scholar, he lectured widely in the USA and England. After the CD reissue of nine of his Expériences Anonymes recordings in the Lyrichord Early Music series—seven volumes of "Music of the Middle Ages" comprising music from England, France and Spain, as well as his Byrd and Dowland recitals with the In Nomine Players and lutenist Joseph Iadone, respectively—Oberlin appeared on radio programs including Performance Today and Millennium of Music in interviews about his life and work in music.

The Penguin Guide to Compact Discs found that "Oberlin's voice is like a very fine wine: once tried, nothing else seems quite the same."

Oberlin can be seen in a 1962 film performing Bach's Cantata No. 54, with Glenn Gould performing the harpsichord part on a harpsipiano. He can also be seen on Classic Arts Showcase on a 1962 Camera Three segment singing an aria from Handel's opera Rodelinda, and on another 1962 segment singing an aria from Britten's A Midsummer Night's Dream; these and other performances are on a DVD, Russell Oberlin: America's Legendary Countertenor, bringing together two telecasts and a 2004 interview.

Oberlin died in New York City on November 25, 2016, aged 88.
