= New York Recorder Guild =

Musical instrument advocacy group

- Formation: 1961
- Headquarters: New York, NY
- Website: https://www.nyrg.org/

The New York Recorder Guild (NYRG) was established on October 16, 1960, as the New York chapter of the American Recorder Society, and incorporated under its current name in 1975. The goal of the organization was to increase interest in the recorder as an instrument and to promote music written for it.

== History ==
The first president of the New York Recorder Guild was Bernard Krainis; Martha Bixler was appointed vice-president and, one year later in 1961, music director. By 1972, the group had 185 members and organized rehearsals monthly with rotating conductors. In the late 1970s, the group moved into offices shared with its parent organization, the American Recorder Society, at 12 East 16th Street, New York, NY. They published the Early Music Newsletter regularly from 1977 through 1991. NYRG organized performances at St. Peter's Episcopal Church and Columbia University.

Monthly gatherings of the group included into the early 2000s, after which point group became largely inactive. In 2017, the NYRG was revitalized by Natalie Lebert and Deborah Booth, with meetings at The Unitarian Church of All Souls in Manhattan. In 2022, these monthly meetings moved to the Church of Saint Mary the Virgin in Manhattan, and NYRG members took part in subway performances of music by Bach, with The Uptown Cantata Project.

== Leadership ==
Past leadership of the NYRG has included:

- Phil Levin
- Andrew Acs
- John DeLucia
- Michael Zumoff
