= Marion Lush =

Marion Lush (1931 – May 4, 1993), known as the "Golden Voice of Polkas" was a polka band leader of the Musical Stars and The White Eagles in Chicago, IL. In addition to lead vocals, he played trumpet and piano.

He is known for popular arrangements of polkas such as, "Hey Cavalier", "Dzien Dobry", "Baby Doll", "Happy Bachelor", and "Oh Yeah" and waltzes, such as "Matka", "I'll Build You a Home", and "Whose Girl Are You". Lush won the International Polka Association's Male Vocalist of the Year award in 1968, 1969, and 1970, and also song of the year for "Blue Eyes Crying in the Rain" in 1970. In 1972, he was inducted into the International Polka Music Hall Of Fame.

== Discography ==
Na Zdrowie - Dyno LP 1606
An Evening With Marion Lush - Dyno LP 1632
Beer, Beer, Beer - Dyno LP 1633
Marion Lush Sings More Polkas - Dyno LP 1688
I'll Build You A Home - Dyno LP 1689
Musical Stars - Dyno 19903
Musical Stars on TV - Multi-Sonic 9902
Lush's Luscious Polkas - Multi-Sonic
Polka Time - Multi-Sonic 9903
Vibrant Polkas - Dyno LP
We Love The Good Old Songs - Dyno
Dzien Dobry - Mint LP 7720 (1977)
On The Road Again
For Adults Only Featuring Richie Tokarz
