= New York Pro Musica =

Vocal and instrumental ensemble

New York Pro Musica was a vocal and instrumental ensemble based in New York City, which specialized in Medieval and Renaissance music. It was co-founded in 1952, under the name Pro Musica Antiqua, by Noah Greenberg, a choral director, and Bernard Krainis, a recorder player who studied with Erich Katz. Other prominent musicians who joined included Russell Oberlin (the first American countertenor) and Martha Blackman (the first American gambist) and Frederick Renz, who founded Early Music Foundation after Pro Musica disbanded.

The ensemble is perhaps best known for reviving the medieval Play of Daniel in the 1950s, which has since become a popular liturgical drama among early music groups. The group gave its first concert at the New School for Social Research in New York City on April 26, 1953. The ensemble performed in 1960 for the Peabody Mason Concert series in Boston. The group continued after Greenberg's death in 1966 and disbanded in 1974. Greenberg's successor, musicologist John Reeves White, took over the direction of the ensemble in 1966; the last director was George Houle, who tried to bring the group more in line with trends in Europe at a time when the United States was not ready for such changes. Houle went on to teach musicology at Stanford University.

In September 1968, the group was devastated by the theft of 10 instruments from a van parked on the street. The New York Times reported that it was unlikely that the thieves knew what was in the boxes, and that there was no ready market for the contents.

Although the group made many vocal and instrumental recordings during its existence, few of them were ever released on compact disc (the Plays of Daniel and Herod were combined into a two-disc set).

The group's last concert was on May 16, 1974, at the Pierpont Morgan Library. The collection of instruments was sold to New York University, where it became the Noah Greenberg Collection of Musical Instruments, in honor of the founder.

== Select discography ==
- New York Pro Musica: An Anthology of Their Greatest Works, Noah Greenberg, conductor. 7 record set. Everest Records (1966, Everest 3145/7)
