= Noah Greenberg =

American conductor (1919–1966)

Noah Greenberg (April 9, 1919 – January 9, 1966) was an American choral conductor.

Greenberg was born in the Bronx. In 1937, aged 18, he joined the Socialist Workers Party of Max Shachtman, and worked as a lathe operator and party activist. He lost work-related draft deferment in 1944 and joined the U.S. Merchant Marine till 1949. By this time he had lost interest in formal politics.

Greenberg, although self-taught, had been conducting amateur choruses such as that of the International Ladies' Garment Workers Union, and by 1950 was known as a choral conductor. With this choir he recorded his first album, We work - We Sing, a commemorative recording of the 1953 Convention of the International Ladies' Garment Workers Union.

Greenberg founded New York Pro Musica in 1952, signing with Esoteric Records of Greenwich Village, and recorded the first of 28 LP albums over the next 14 years. When Pro Musica was formed, it was a sextet and included the countertenor Russell Oberlin; labour activist and leftist Jesse Simons was one of the first members of the board of directors. In 1953 William Kolodney booked the ensemble for a three-part performance series at the 92nd Street Y, contributing to the group's early momentum.

Terry Teachout, writing in 2001, said "New Yorkers who attended his concerts in the 50’s and 60’s will need no reminder of the pivotal role he played in introducing early music to a generation of American listeners." His "staging of The Play of Daniel, an 11th-century liturgical drama that had not been performed for 700 years before being presented by Greenberg in 1958 ... is still remembered as one of the key moments in the history of the early-music revival." This performance launched the singing career of Oberlin, and included contributions from Meyer Shapiro, W. H. Auden, and Lincoln Kirstein. Kirstein was a financial backer of the group, and was the artistic director of Daniel.

Greenberg's recreation of The Play of Daniel was a significant effort: "What was left of The Play of Daniel, guarded by scholars, was one manuscript: a text of medieval Latin words and a simple musical notation, one note for each syllable.... [T]he given from which Noah Greenberg set about to re-create the play was less in quantity, and no more essential in kind, than Milton's given (a story and an old form) when he set about writing Paradise Lost." The production was so successful that the US government paid for a European tour in 1960. Teachout suggests that the stress of Pro Musica's success and growth perhaps contributed to Greenberg's ill health.

He died at University Hospital, Manhattan, after an apparent heart attack, on January 9, 1966. His death at only 46 apparently caused his mother to also die when she heard the news.

Auden wrote of him, in regard to his having successfully revived interest in medieval, renaissance and baroque music, "To devote one’s musical career, as Noah Greenberg did, to works outside (the standard concert) repertory, calls for faith and courage of the highest order."

The Noah Greenberg Award of the American Musicological Society, where he was a member, is named after him. When Pro Musica disbanded, their period instruments were donated to New York University as the Noah Greenberg Collection of Musical Instruments.

== Select discography ==
- New York Pro Musica: An Anthology of Their Greatest Works, Noah Greenberg, conductor. 7 record set. Everest Records (1966, Everest 3145/7)
- New York Pro Musica. Elizabethan and Jacobean Ayres, Madrigals and Dances. Directed by Noah Greenberg. Decca DL 9406, (1959), LP.
- New York Pro Musica. English Medieval Christmas Carols (Tradition TCD 1056) (1956).
- New York Pro Musica. Music of the Medieval Court and Countryside (1957).
- New York Pro Musica. Spanish Music of the Renaissance (1960).

== Select publications ==
- An English Songbook, later re-released as An English Medieval and Renaissance Song Book and An Anthology of English Medieval and Renaissance Vocal Music. 1961. Doubleday & Co.
- An Elizabethan Song Book: Lute Songs: Madrigals & Rounds. 1955. With W.H. Auden and Chester Kallman.
- The Play of Daniel, edited for modern performances. 1959.
- Play of Herod: A 12th Century Music in Drama. 1965. Oxford University Press.
