= Hoffnung Music Festival =

Humorous classical music concerts

Coordinates: 51°30′21″N 00°07′00″W

The Hoffnung Music Festivals were a series of humorous classical music festivals created by cartoonist and amateur tuba player Gerard Hoffnung and held in the Royal Festival Hall in London. The concerts consisted of humorous works specially commissioned from well-known composers of the day.

== 1956 concert ==
The 1956 concert was recorded, and is available in the American market on Angel Records 35500. Music from The Hoffnung Music Festival Concert, Royal Festival Hall, London. An Extravagant Evening of Symphonic Caricature devised by Gerald Hoffnung, Producer: Sam Wanamaker, Organizer: John Amis. It was recorded at the concert, 13 November 1956, by EMI and released in the U.S. by Angel Records. The orchestra was the Morley College Orchestra (billed as the Hoffnung Symphony Orchestra)

The concert opens with Ernst Bean, the General Manager of the Festival Hall, announcing that “owing to circumstances over which the London County Council and the management of the hall have no control, tonight’s concert will take place exactly as advertised.”

Programme:

- Fanfare by Francis Baines

Trumpeters of the Royal Military School of Music
Conducted by the Composer

The work begins with a long drumroll, tricking the audience into rising for the national anthem.

Following Malcolm Arnold's entrance, violinist Yfrah Neaman ran through the stage playing The Irish Washerwoman

- A Grand, Grand Overture, Op. 57 by Malcolm Arnold

Conducted by the Composer

In addition to the large orchestra, the overture consists of a quartet of 3 vacuum cleaners and an electric floor polisher. The work is dedicated to President Hoover

- Andante from the ”Surprise” Symphony by Joseph Haydn (with additional surprises by Donald Swann)

Conducted by Lawrence Leonard

This version of an already humorous work consists of more surprises, such as one of the Festival Hall organ pipes falling over when the orchestra hits the fortissimo "surprise" chord, the violins playing in the wrong key twice, a new "waltz" variation with a ballerina (Moyra Fraser) dancing through the aisles and ending with members of the BBC Music Division playing the theme on stone hot water bottles.

- The Lift by Donald Swann (text by John Betjeman)

Singer - Jenny Johnson
Piano - Donald Swann

- Mazurka No. 49 in A minor, Op. 68, No. 2 by Frédéric Chopin (arr. Daniel Abrams for tuba quartet, introduced by Gerard Hoffnung)

Performed by Gerard Hoffnung with members of "the London Symphony Orchestra of New York"

- Concerto Popolare (a Piano Concerto to end all Piano Concertos) by Franz Reizenstein

Piano - Yvonne Arnaud
Conducted by Norman Del Mar

The concerto starts with the orchestra playing the opening bars of Tchaikovsky's Piano Concerto No. 1, only for the pianist to enter with the opening of Grieg's Piano Concerto in A Minor. The rest of the concerto combines the two concertos into one, mixing with themes such as Pop Goes the Weasel and Roll Out the Barrell, ending with conductor and soloist fighting for the last chord.

- Orchestral Switch by Frank Butterworth

Conducted by Lawrence Leonard

A short overture consisting of forty-eight quotations from other works. According to the program, "Try to spot as many as you can; the usual prizes will not be offered."

- Geographical Fugue by Ernst Toch

Liverpool Chamber Music Group Singers
Conducted by Fritz Spiegel

This work, while in the form of a fugue, consists of the choir declaiming various places without variance in pitch.

- Concerto for Hosepipe and Orchestra (3rd Movement) by Leopold Mozart (arr. Norman Del Mar)

Hosepipe - Dennis Brain
Conducted by Norman Del Mar

A transcription of the last movement of Leopold Mozart's Sinfonia Pastorella for Alphorn and Strings.

- Lochinvar for Speakers and Percussion by Humphrey Searle (text by Sir Walter Scott)

Speakers - Yvonne Arnaud and Gerard Hoffnung
Conducted by Lawrence Leonard

At one point in the score, the composer indicates "tempo di rock 'n' roll"

- Variations on Annie Laurie by Gordon Jacob
  - Theme: Alerto, ma non troppo
  - Variation I: Poco Inglesemente
  - Variation II: Molto Zingaresemente
  - Variation III: Alla Gigolo
  - Variation IV: Polifonia Profunda
  - Finale: Assai.

Festival Ensemble
Conducted by the Composer

The work is scored for an unusual combination of two piccolos, heckelphone, two contrabass clarinets, two contrabassoons, serpent, contrabass serpent, hurdy gurdy, harmonium, and subcontrabass tuba.

- Roman Festivals by Ottorino Respighi

Conducted by Lawrence Leonard

Although not a humorous work, this performance featured several distinguished guests playing in the orchestra, including Malcolm Arnold on the trumpet, Norman Del Mar on the French horn, Yvonne Arnaud on the piano, Dennis Brain on the organ, Hugo D'Alton on the mandolin, and Gerard Hoffnung on the tuba.

The liner notes were written by John Amis, one of the organizers of the event. He wrote that it was called the Crazy Concert by the London newspapers, and that all 3000-odd seats were sold within two hours of the opening of the box office, breaking all records for Royal Festival Hall at that time and selling faster than the previous Liberace concert.

== 1958 concert ==
The 1958 production was the Hoffnung Interplanetary Music Festival, Royal Festival Hall, 21 & 22 November. The EMI recording for the American market was Angel 35800, released in both mono and stereo.

Programme:

- Introductory Music played in the Foyer by Francis Chagrin

Musicians of the Royal Military School of Music

As its name suggests, this piece is played in the foyer while the audience is walking to the concert hall. The recording is edited in such a way that it sounds as though one were walking past the musicians into the hall

- A Hoffnung Festival Overture by Francis Baines

Conducted by the Composer
Trumpeters of the Royal Military School of Music
Organ - John Weeks

- Metamorphosis on a Bed-time Theme by Joseph Horovitz (libretto by Alistair Sampson)

Conducted by the Composer
Soprano - April Cantelo
Bass-Baritone - Ian Wallace
Harpsichord - Lionel Salter

A series of five musical commercials for Bournvita in the style of Bach, Mozart, Verdi, Schoenberg, and Stravinsky.

- Concerto for Conductor and Orchestra by Francis Chagrin

Conducted by Gerard Hoffnung (as "The Maestro")

This work mostly relies on its visual humor, which is why it is abridged on the recording. Throughout the concert, Hoffnung demonstrates some unorthodox conducting skills, such as conducting to total silence, sobbing on stage, and engaging in a sword fight with Joseph Cooper (at the piano). The work also includes a "cadenza", which just consists of the conductor waving his arms around carelessly while the orchestra remains silent. According to the program "Why not televise entire symphony concerts but advise those viewers who are not deaf to switch off the sound?"

- Sugar Plums by Elizabeth Poston

Dolmetsch Ensemble

A mashup of various themes by Tchaikovsky arranged for a Renaissance Ensemble. The cannons that would be presented in the 1812 Overture are replaced with popguns.

- "Burlesque" from Music for the Theater by Aaron Copland

Conducted by the Composer

- The United Nations by Malcolm Arnold

Conducted by the Composer

In this work, the composer seeks to "re-create the fine spirit of human endeavour which becomes so apparent that the nations meet together." At one point, a huge military band wanders through the stage blasting several patriotic songs

- The Famous Tay Whale by Mátyás Seiber (text by William McGonagall)

Declaimed by Edith Evans)
Conducted by the Composer

The scoring of this work includes a large foghorn played by Annetta Hoffnung (Gerard Hoffnung's wife)

- Waltz for Restricted Orchestra by Peter Racine Fricker

Conducted by the Composer

This work involves the strings playing "in every way except in the normal fashion." and the woodwinds and brass playing their mouthpieces without their instrument attached.

- Punkt Contrapunkt by "Bruno Heinz Jaja" (alias Humphrey Searle)

Conducted by Norman Del Mar

A short parody on 12-tone serial music and Klangfarbenmelodie. The work is preceded by an overly long analysis by "Dr. Klaus Domgraf-Fassbaender" (Gerard Hoffnung), and "Prof. Von der Vogelweide" (John Amis).

- Let's Fake an Opera, or The Tales of Hoffnung by Franz Reizenstein (libretto by William Mann)

The Hoffnung Festival Opera Chorus
Conducted by Norman Del Mar (assisted by Brian Priestman)
Set for instruments by Eric Wetherell
Produced by Colin Graham

The concert closes with "an operatic divertissement, a miracle of controlled stage-craft - five operas for the price of one!" The plot of the opera is that - "the setting is outside the cigarette factory in old Nuremberg. Beckmesser woos Azucena, the sex-kitten of the tobacco girls. Othello rides in with his swan which is chased away by William Tell, Max and other huntsmen. Othello, retiring defeated from the hunt, meets Salome who on the removal of all her veils, proves to be Fidelio and sings herself into a stupor. Brünnhilde, in search of a husband, is disappointed – Fidelio is a woman in disguise – and even the rival serenaders of whom she has hopes turn out to be wooing Mélisande. However she gets her man – Radames – in the end. Fidelio awakens and departs on Brünnhilde’s tricycle, Grane, leaving the frustrated Nightwatchman to steal well deserved winks on the vacated bed … etc., etc."

Roles:

Roles, Voice Types, Premiere Cast
Roles	Voice Types	Premiere Cast
Azucena, Mélisande	mezzo-soprano	Edith Coates
Beckmesser	baritone	Otakar Kraus
Otello	tenor	Edgar Evans
The Nightwatchman	bass-baritone	Ian Wallace
Salome (revealed as Fidelio)	soprano	Sheila Rex
Brünnhilde	soprano	Gloria Lane
Don Giovanni	baritone	Peter Glossop
Manrico	tenor	John Dobson
Nadir	tenor	Duncan Robertson
Escamillo	bass	Owen Brannigan

== 1960 concert ==
The 1960 production was the Hoffnung Memorial Concert and was a memorial tribute to Gerard Hoffnung, who had died a year earlier. It was again held in the Royal Festival Hall and performed by the Morley College Orchestra. Works performed included A Hoffnung Fanfare and Carnival of Animals op.72 by Malcolm Arnold.

== 1961 concert ==
The 1961 production was the Hoffnung Astronautical Music Festival, and was once again held in the Royal Festival Hall, 28 November. It was also recorded by EMI in mono and stereo and released in the U.S. on Angel Records 35828. The recording was reissued on CD by Hallmark on 20 February 2012.

Programme:

- "Rigmarole" - Introductory Music Played in the Foyer by Francis Baines

Musicians of the Royal Military School of Music

- Festival Anthem by Francis Baines

Conducted by Norman Del Mar
Trumpeters of the Royal Military School of Music
The Hoffnung Festival Choral Society

- Leonora Overture No. 4 by Ludwig van Beethoven (alias Malcolm Arnold)

Conducted by Norman Del Mar
Trumpeters of the Royal Military School of Music

Modeled after Beethoven's Leonora Overture No. 3, this work present some bizarre twists, including the offstage trumpeters entering at the wrong times, The Happy Wanderers' Street Band interrupting the music, and the orchestra suddenly plunging into an out of place waltz rhythm. The actual composer was not named in the program, but the work of Malcolm Arnold was unmistakable.

- Duet from "The Barber of Darmstadt" by "Bruno Heinz Jaja" (alias Humphrey Searle; translation from the German libretto by William Mann)

Conducted by Humphrey Searle
Herr Knochen - Owen Brannigan
Der Redepartner - John Amis
The Hoffnung Festival Choral Society

Just like Punkt Contrapunkt, this duet is a parody on 12-tone serial music.

- The Ballad of County Down by Francis Chagrin

Conducted by the Composer
Speaker - Forbes Robinson

The key of this work is "mostly in D Major." The work crescendos to a dramatic countdown (seeing as space craft was all the rage at the time of the concert), mixed with themes such as Flight of the Bumblebee and Yankee Doodle.

- Grand Concerto Gastronomique for eater, waiter, food, and large orchestra by Malcolm Arnold

Conducted by the Composer
Eater - Henry Sherek
Waiter - Tutte Lemkow

This work was not present on the audio recording due to its extreme visual humor. The work centers around a diner who has to eat his way through an entire meal for the duration of the piece.

- ”Excerpt” from "Belshazzar's Feast" by William Walton (conducted by the composer with a fly swatter, which turned out to consist of just a single chord and the chorus shouting "Slain!")

Horrortorio by Joseph Horovitz (libretto by Alistair Sampson)

The Hoffnung Festival Choral Society
Conducted by the Composer
Harpsichord - Lionel Salter

Roles:

Roles, Voice Types, Premiere Cast
Roles	Voice Types	Premiere Cast
Dracula's Daughter	soprano	April Cantelo
Dowager Baroness Frankenstein	contralto	Pamela Bowden
Narrator (Edgar Allan Poe), Frankenstein's Son	tenor	Stephen Manton
Count Dracula	bass	John Frost

This extravagant oratorio, taken from "a scenario by Maurice Richardson" tells the story of the marriage of Dracula's Daughter and Frankenstein's Son. The music parodies the classical oratorio while taking on "new and horrible dimensions".

- Mobile for Seven Orchestras by Lawrence Leonard

The Hoffnung Festival Choral Society
Trumpeters of the Royal Military School of Music
Conducted by the Composer and others
Organ - Lionel Salter

The opposite of "static" where the players remain on stage throughout the work, this short piece has all the members of the orchestra moving about on stage, "faithfully following their respective conductors."

== 1969 concert ==
On 17 February 1969, a Hoffnung concert was staged in the Royal Festival Hall in aid of the Notting Hill Housing Trust. It included some of the works from the 1958 festival, and a new work to celebrate Hoffnung. The conductor for most of the works was Norman Del Mar with the New Philharmonia Orchestra, and several singers from 1958 returned. Spelling and punctuation are as in the 1969 programme notes:

Programme:

- A Word from Our Founder by Malcolm Williamson

Introducted by the Composer

- Metamorphosis on a Bed-time Theme

Conducted by the Composer
Soprano - April Cantelo
Bass-Baritone - Ian Wallace
Harpsichord - Courtney Kenny

- Sugar Plums

Dolmetsch Ensemble

- Concerto Popolare

Piano - Bernard Sumner

- Punkt Contrapunkt
- Concerto for Conductor and Orchestra

Conducted by Dudley Moore

- Let's Fake an Opera

Roles:

Roles, Cast
Roles	Performers
Beckmesser	Derek Hammond Stroud
Azucena (Carmen)	Edith Coates
Otello	Edgar Evans
Odette-Odile	Deanne Bergsma
The Nightwatchman	Ian Wallace
Salome/Fidelio	Sheila Rex
Wotan, Escamillo	Gerwyn Morgan
Brünnhilde	Judith Pierce
Nadir	Duncan Robertson
Manrico	David Kane
Don Giovanni	Richard van Allan
Mélisande	April Cantelo
Radames	Neville Griffiths

According to the programme, "A two-minute period (at 4.30 am) has been allocated by the Concert Organisers for Community Coughing. If you have a promising cough, please try to save it until then."

== 1976 concert ==
On 14 December 1976, a Hoffnung concert was staged in the Royal Albert Hall, entitled "Hear Hear, Hoffnung", featuring the BBC Concert Orchestra, as well as several distinguished conductors and performers.

Programme:

- A Hoffnung Fanfare by Malcolm Arnold

Fanfare Trumpeters of the Life Guards, the Grenadier Guards and the Coldstream Guards
Conducted by Major A.J. Richards

The work is scored for 36 trumpets.

- Ode by Colin Graham

Declaimed by Annette Crosbie

- A Grand, Grand Overture

Conducted by the Composer
The vacuum cleaner soloists were the Amadeus Quartet.
Riflemen from the 4th Battalion

- Metamorphosis on a Bed-time Theme

Conducted by the Composer
Soprano - April Cantelo
Bass-Baritone - Ian Wallace

- Sugar Plums
- Haydn's Surprise Symphony

Conducted by Donald Swann
Ocarinas - Patrick Moore and William Mann
Bottle Players - Barbara Kelly, Sylvia Rogers, Humphrey Burton, Eric Thompson, John Calder, Robert Ponsonby, Angus McGill

- The United Nations

Bands of the Royal Life Guards, the Grenadier Guards and the Coldstream Guards
Conducted by Jonathan Del Mar

- Punkt Contrapunkt

Introduced by John Amis and John Bird
Conducted by Christopher Adey

- Concerto Popolare

Piano - Daniël Wayenberg
Conducted by Simon Rattle

- Let's Fake an Opera

Members of the English Music Theatre Chorus and Ballet
Conducted by Lawerence Leonard

Roles, Cast
Roles	Performers
Beckmesser	Thomas Lawlor
Azucena (Carmen), Mélisande	Ann Howard
Otello, Manrico	Kenneth Woollam
The Nightwatchman	Ian Wallace
Salome/Fidelio	Ava June
Wotan, Escamillo	Harold Blackburn
Brünnhilde	Ann Hood
Nadir	Bernard Dickerson
Don Giovanni	Peter Knapp
Swan Queen	Laura Conner

== 1988 concert ==
On 12 and 13 February 1988, two reprise concerts were performed and recorded at the Royal Festival Hall and released by Decca. Many distinguished guests appeared, including Donald Swann, Annetta Hoffnung (playing the role of "orchestral maid"), and Gerard's daughter Emily. The program, performed by the Philharmonia Orchestra and conducted by Michael Massey and Tom Bergman, consisted of highlights from previous Hoffnung Festivals as well as a few new pieces to keep the audience on their toes.

Programme:

- A Hoffnung Festival Fanfare by Frank Renton

Trumpeters of the Royal Military School of Music
Conducted by the Composer

- A Grand, Grand Overture

Vacuum Cleaners - Jane Glover, Christopher Laing, Bill Oddie, and Donald Swann

- Concerto for Hosepipe & Orchestra

Hosepipe - Richard Watkins

- The Ballad of County Down
- The Famous Tay Whale

Speaker - Eleanor Bron
Foghorn - Esther Rantzen

- Aria from Quasimodo e Giulietta (Act 9, Scene 12) by "Giacomo Scarlatina", new realisation by "Maynard Nelson" (alias Wilfred Josephs)

Tenor - Christoph Ellermeier
Conducted by Mark Fitz-Gerald

The music consists of a mashup of several opera melodies, while the libretto is a mashup of various Italian musical terms

- Leonora Overture No. 4

Before the work is played, an audience member (Raimund Herincx) coughs rather loudly. He is checked on by a nurse (Jill Gomez), after which they sing a hilarious operatic duet.

- Lochinvar

Speakers - Emily Richard and Ian Wallace

- Concerto Popolare

Piano - David Owen Norris

- Concerto D’Amore for Violin and Orchestra by Wilfred Josephs

Violins - Jagdish Mistry and (unexpectedly) Candida Thompson

The piece starts with the concerts manager announcing that due to a booking error, two violins have been scheduled for the same concert. In order to "avoid legal proceedings", the managers decide that both of them should play the concerto. At the end, the female violinist bows the last harmonic (while the male violinist fingers it), during which they fall into a kiss.

- Overture “The Heaving Bagpipe” by Wilfred Josephs (text by Tom Bergman)

Speaker - Raimund Herincx

So called because parts of the music sound suspiciously similar to Rossini's Overture to the Thieving Magpie.

- Haydn's Surprise Symphony

Ballerina - Rachel Hester
The Oliphant Chuckerbutty Ensemble
Children from Fleet Primary School under the direction of Dr. Steven Paul
Bottle Players - Bamber Gascoigne, Emily Hoffnung, John Lill, Michael Mates M.P., Sybil Michelow, Patrick Moore, Gerald Priestland, Desmond Wilcox

- Metamorphosis on a Bedtime Theme

Conducted by the Composer
Soprano - Felicity Lott
Baritone - David Wilson-Johnson

- Orchestral Switch
- Disconcerto for Piano and Orchestra by Wilfred Josephs

Piano - David Owen Norris

Before the work is played, Annetta wipes down the keys of the piano while the French horns blare out Wagner's Overture to Tannhäuser.

The performances of Lochinvar and the Heaving Bagpipe are preceded by a bagpipe solo performed by Lachlan A. Stewart

== Sources ==
- John o'London's Volume 3 (1960)
- Hoffnung, Gerard. The Hoffnung music festival. Publisher: Hoffnung Partnership, 2000, ISBN 1-903643-02-3
- The Hoffnung Music Festival Concert Recorded at the Royal Festival Hall, London. Angel Records 35500, LP, 1956
- The Hoffnung Interplanetary Music Festival, Royal Festival Hall, 21 & 22 November 1958, Angel Records 35800, LP, 1958
- http://www.musicweb-international.com/classrev/2002/nov02/HoffnungConcerts.htm#ixzz88sU8HhGJ
- https://gerardhoffnung.com/concerts/
- https://ccgb.org.uk/wordpress/?p=7559
