= Symphony No. 6 (Langgaard) =

Symphony by Danish composer Rued Langgaard

- The Heaven-rending
- by Rued Langgaard
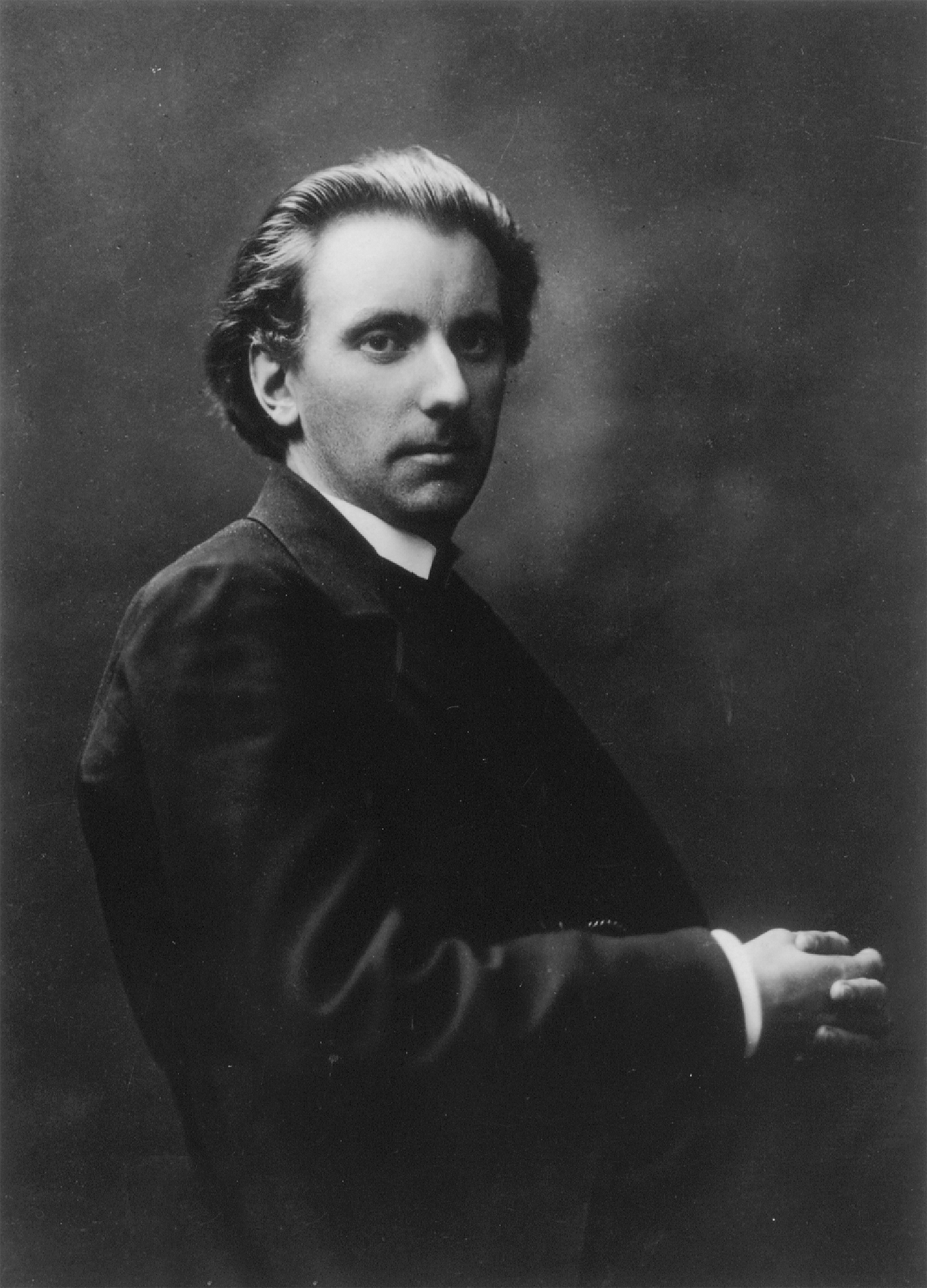
- Langgaard in 1918
- Native name: Det himmelrivende
- Catalogue: BVN 165
- Period: Modernism
- Composed: 1919–1920
- Published: 1946
- Publisher: Edition Dania (Society for the Publication of Danish Music)
- Duration: 20–21 minutes
- Movements: 1

Premiere
- Date: 15 January 1923
- Location: Fest-halle of Karlsruhe
- Conductor: Rued Langgaard
- Performers: Badisches Landestheater-Orchester

The Symphony No. 6 (later subtitled "The Heaven-rending") is a symphony composed by Rued Langgaard between 1919 and 1920. It was successfully premiered in Karlsruhe on 15 January 1923, but the ensuing first performance in Denmark was a disaster. Written in a single movement subdivided in several sections, the work was inspired by Nielsen's Symphony No. 4, known as "The Inextinguishable". On later revisions, the work took different programmatic narratives, ending with religious struggle between Jesus and "spiritual wickedness in high places". Despite its poor initial reception in Denmark, the work was performed, recorded and broadcast multiple times afterwards.

== Background ==
Between 1918 and 1925, Langgaard entered a modernist phase in which he explored new ways to express existential and religious ideas, as well as increasingly apocalyptic topics. During this period, he composed several experimental pieces, including Music of the Spheres (1918), Symphony No. 6 (1920), Violin Sonata No. 2 (1921), the opera Antichrist (1923) and Music of the Abyss (1924). The first two were premiered in Germany with great success. However, Langgaard's music was mostly poorly received in his natal Denmark.

After the Second Schleswig War, Danish music distanced itself from Germanic romanticism. Langgaard, who wrote in a style closely indebted to said language, was at odds with audiences and critics alike. Carl Nielsen was at the time considered the national composer, and his influence was so strong that he almost monopolized the Danish music scene (The Carl Nielsen era), alongside Thomas Laub. Both of these composers advocated for a national musical language based on earlier music, such as the renaissance, as well as repressing the influence of postromanticism, particularly in its Germanic vein. The influence of those who opposed Nielsen, such as the Langgaard family, gradually vanished.

== Composition ==
The piece was conceived on 3 September 1919, according to the composer, by a flashback to the spring of 1894 (when he was less than a year of age). It was also more generally inspired by Nielsen's Symphony No. 4. Langgaard's symphony was then composed between 14 September and 1 October, and orchestrated between 24 October and 7 December 1919. The fair copy was completed on 28 May 1920. Langgaard later reused much of the music of the symphony into the prelude and orchestral interludes of his opera Antichrist, which he finished in 1923.

After the fiasco that was the first performance in Denmark, Langgaard made initial revisions between 1924 and 1925 aiming to shorten the work, as well as adding its first subtitle, "The Irreconcilable", and showing his opposition to Nielsen's music. In autumn 1927, the work was renumbered as Symphony No. 6, bearing "Dance macabre" as new subtitle and a programmatic preface. This contributed to Langgaard's pretence that the symphony was a different work to that of the scandalous Danish premiere of Symphony No. 5.

Further revisions between 1928 and 1930 saw approximately 285 bars of music cut from the work. The previous subtitle was replaced with a new one: "Disastro (Purgatory)". It was at this stage that Langgaard clearly delineated the structure of the work as Tema con variazioni, two versions of a single theme and five variations. By the time of its radio performance in 1935, the work had its final subtitle, "The Heaven-Rending". A final series of revisions took place between 1944–46.

On 22 February 1946, The Society for the Publication of Danish Music contacted Langgaard showing their willingness to publish the work. After some small corrections (tempo marks, dynamics, etc) it was published, one of the few scores Langgaard saw printed on his lifetime. This was an important recognition of the composer and his music, especially since the score was issued to mark the 75th anniversary of the society at the end of 1946. A critical edition of the symphony was published in 2017.

== Inspiration ==
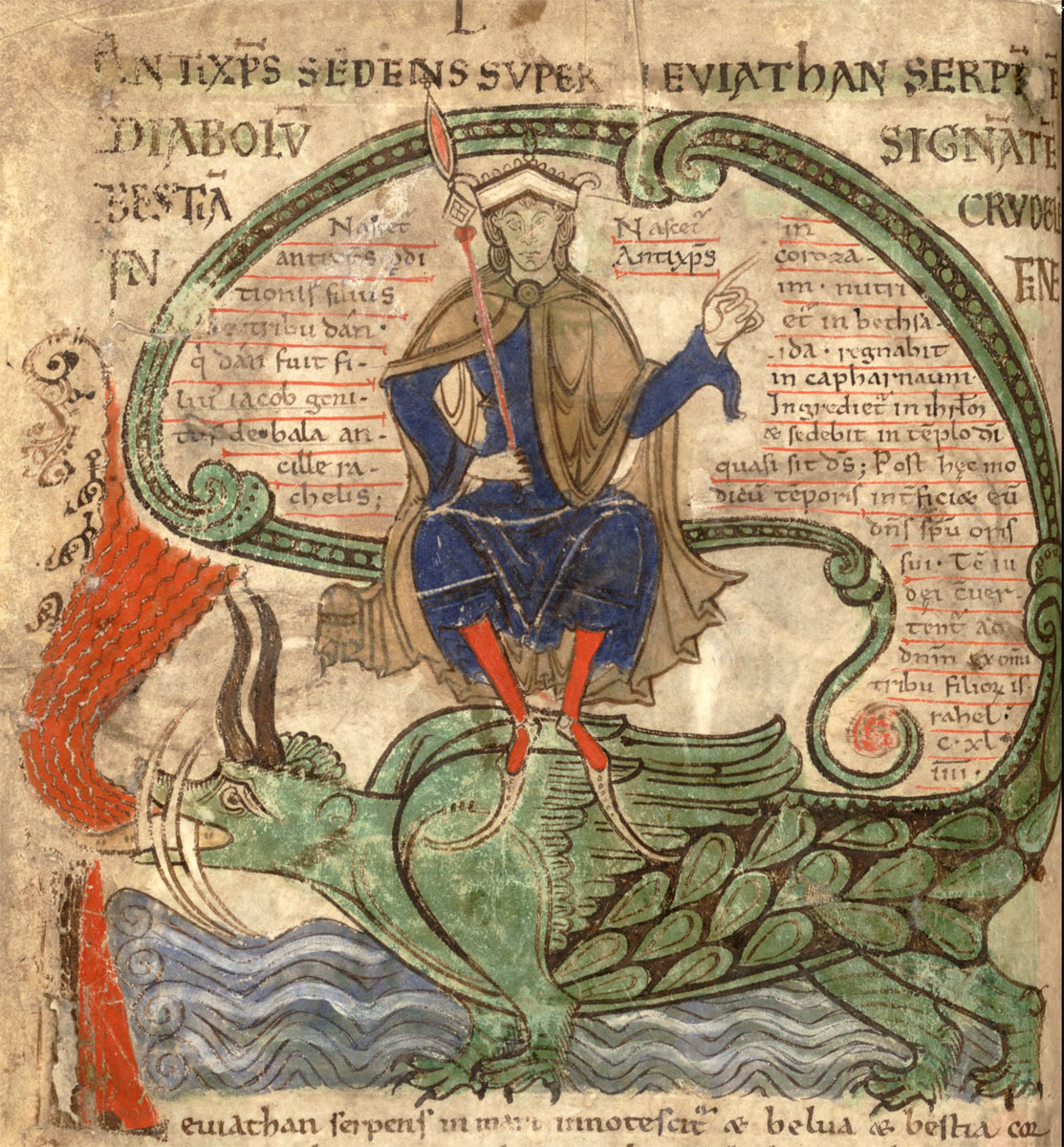
Illustration of the Antichrist sitting on the Leviathan, from the Liber Floridus of 1120

Originally, the work was purely abstract and carried no subtitles nor programs. In an interview for Danish newspaper B.T. in January 1922, he was asked what he wanted to achieve with his art to which Langgaard replied:

I want enlargement, expansion. The human spirit longs for expansion, but in the way that music has developed through history, it cannot express what is relevant nowadays, what all of us are taken with (eternal longing). No, music is limited by its present tonal system, major and minor.

Langgaard added the following program in autumn 1927, alongside the "Dance Macabre".

A gentle, ethereal motif sounds in eternity, enters the struggle of existence, is tormented, raped, spoiled; recovers, and desperately engages in an endless fight as between knives, and finally — bleeding and completely dizzy and confused but erect (tempered) and determined (honed) returns to eternity.

Shortly before publication, the composer proposed the new subtitle "Beneath the Heavens", and offered a scriptural passage in the Epistle to the Ephesians, Chapter VI, verse 12, which says: "For we wrestle not against flesh and blood, but against principalities, against powers, against the rulers of the darkness of this world, against spiritual wickedness in high places."

This first explicitly religious narrative was expanded upon, conceptualizing the whole piece as a struggle between good and evil. In a program note of 21 January 1949, Langgaard exposes the following programme:

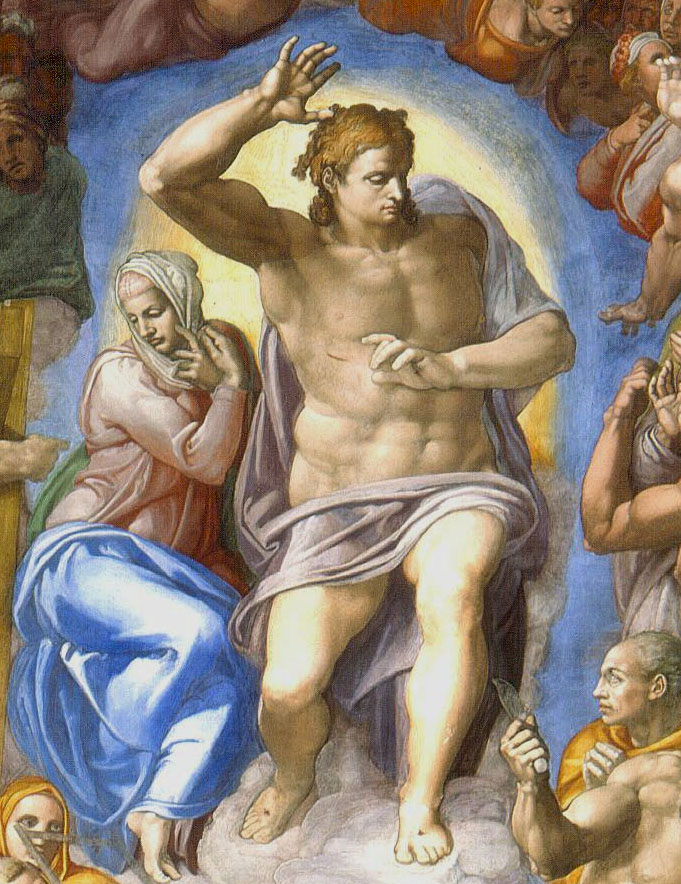
Depiction of Jesus in The Last Judgement of Michelangelo (1534–1541)

"The Heaven-Rending” [...] portrays the struggle between Jesus and "spiritual wickedness in high places", of which Paul makes mention in his Epistle to the Ephesians, Chap. VI, v.12, to which the motto of the symphony refers. It is partly from the Danish hymnwriter Brorson and partly from St. Paul, and says the following: "Then Jesus forcibly intervened and rent the rending army of evil in the firmament.

The Symphony, which is in a single movement, is highly consistently constructed on a single motif, the intervals of which etch into all keys at one and the same time. A music which, because of the strict implementation of these intervals, in all possible ways, gradually begins to sound like modern music, but this is not so. The organ motif is followed through to a resounding major triad harmony of the romantic, light nature that the motif is characterised by from the outset.

In the local newspaper of Ribe, Ribe Stiftstidende, Langgaard also mentioned the alternative subtitle of "The Heaven-Utterly-Rending", and offered a more accessible description of the work:

[The symphony] only has one movement which starts with angels’ voices that gradually change into the most rending demoniacal voices, but the image ends with light triumphant. The almost corrosive way the music sounds can make one think of modern music, but the symphony has not been composed in a modern way - and the treatment of the notes is the composer's own idea.

In a series of letters between Langgaard and conductor Launy Grøndahl, the composer revealed certain ideas about his work, such as "My No. 6 is a state, not 'absolute music' It is psychological and therefore requires elucidation in a few words.", or "My No. 6 is simply the razor-sharp bright, barren firmament in dissonance." In addition, he claimed that the symphony was "a protest against C.N's (Carl Nielsen) 'The Inextinguishable'".

== Instrumentation ==
The symphony is scored for symphony orchestra.

Woodwinds

3 flutes (1 doubling piccolo)
3 oboes (1 doubling cor anglais)
3 clarinets
3 bassoons (1 doubling contrabassoon)

Brass

4 horns
8 trumpets (3 doubling trumpets in F)
3 trombones
1 tuba

Percussion

2 sets of timpani
Tubular bells
Church bell in F#
Triangle
Snare drum
Cymbals

Keyboards

Celesta
Organ (ad libitum)

Strings

2 harps (in unison)
Violins I
Violins II
Violas
Violoncellos
Double basses

== Form ==
External audio
- Performed by the Danish National Radio Symphony Orchestra under Thomas Dausgaard
- Thema (Versione I)
- Thema (Versione II)
- Var. I (Introduzione)
- Var. II (Fuga)
- Var. III (Toccata)
- Var. IV (Sonata)
- Var. V (Coda)

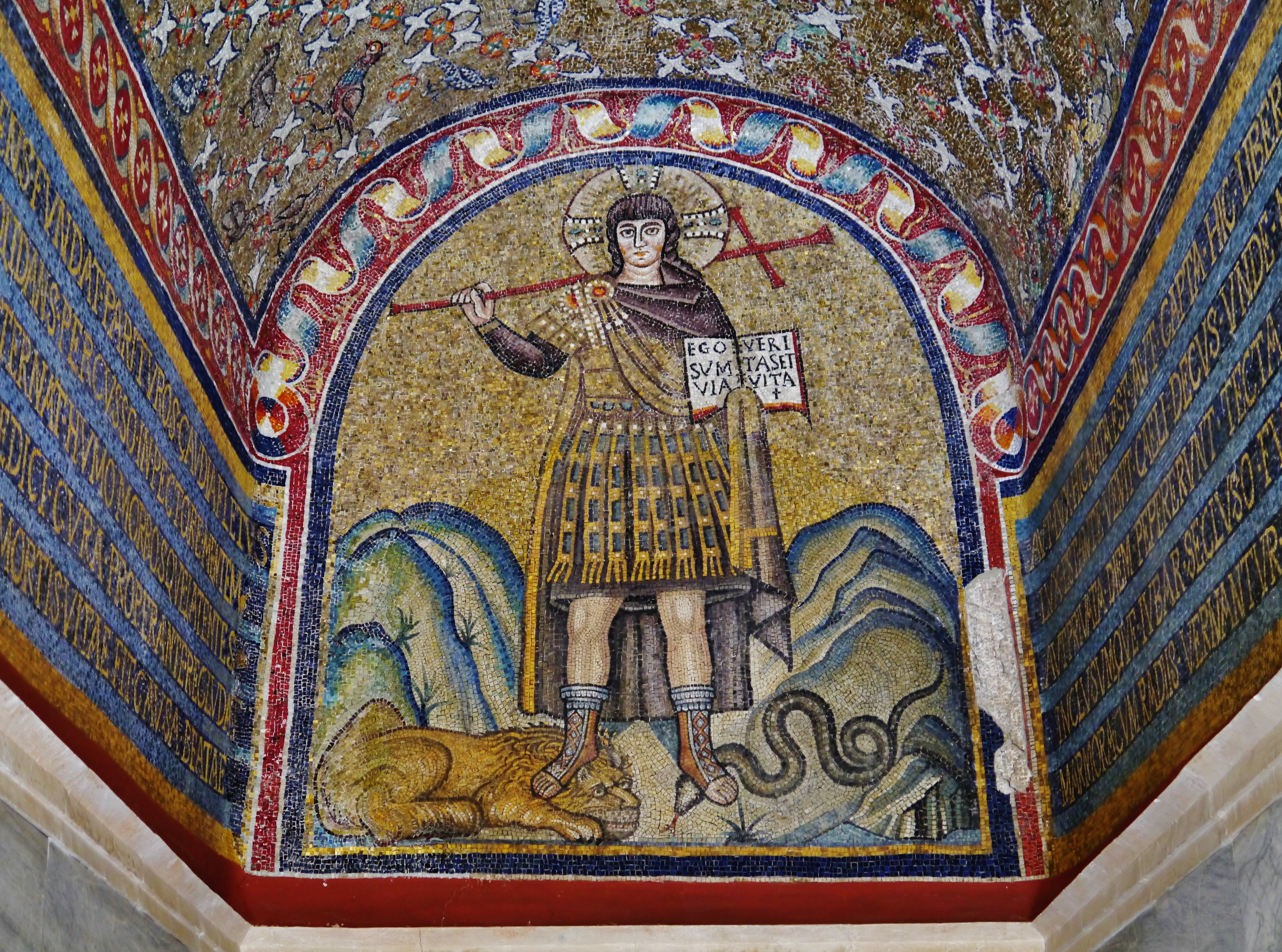
Mosaic of Jesus Christ depicted as a warrior. Archbishop's Chapel in Ravenna (circa 495)

The symphony is written in a single movement subdivided in several sections, broadly described as theme and variations. Danish classical music writer Jens Cornelius remarked the many similarities between Nielsen's fourth and Langgaard's sixth; "The emphasis is on polyphony, atonal features, strong dissonances and two sets of timpani that carry out a battle of cosmic proportions. But Langgaard’s aim is actually diametrically opposed to that of Carl Nielsen." Esben Tange described the work as symbolist, reflecting the death of God.

- Thema (Versione I). Corrosif, misérable, religieux (𝅗𝅥. = 40)
- Thema (Versione II): L’istesso tempo, corrosif – Maestoso – Movibile religioso
- Var. I (Introduzione): Allegro non troppo (𝅘𝅥 = 88)
- Var. II (Fuga): Frenetico marziale (Tutta la forza), corrosif (𝅘𝅥 = 80)
- Var. III (Toccata): Poco a poco furioso mosso – Mosso furioso
- Var. IV (Sonata): Maestoso frenetico (𝅘𝅥 = 72) – (𝅘𝅥 = 108) – Movibile. Magnificamente (𝅘𝅥 = 108–112) – Più a più furioso – Magnificamente – Allargando – Magnificamente (𝅗𝅥. = 40) – Frenetico, poco a poco allegro furioso – Completo furios

The work opens with a hymn-like main theme in F major, introduced by second violins before passing into full strings in a five-part polyphony. Pianissimo timpani rolls, separated by silences, lead into the second version of the material: a heavily chromatic and dissonant twist of the main theme, ominously accompanied by blows of the church bell. According to Cornelius, both versions represent "light and dark" or "Christ and Antichrist". Musicologist Bendt Viinholt Nielsen claims that this reflected a dualistic worldview between beauty and destruction, which oppose and complement each other. The music then reaches a maestoso climax on full orchestra, with the first notes of the main theme on the brass. This shortened version of the material is a recurring motive throughout the piece.

Each ensuing variation is named after a type of classical form, which according to Cornelius, points to the abstract nature of the music. Variation I (introduzione) opens with menacing tremoli and the motive on doublebasses, which is lyrically taken by clarinets and oboes in a moment of great contrast. The music then grows in an expressive and richly scored climax. Variation II consists of a fiercely violent and dissonant fugue marked Frenetico marziale ("Insanely warlike"), nearly atonal in its harmony and constantly fortissimo in its dynamics. Variation III is a toccata characterized by its quick figures on strings and woodwinds, beginning on pianissimo before a crescendo reaches fortissisimo near the end. It also features virtuoso orchestration.

Variation IV (sonata) opens with the motive on full orchestra in a massive climax, leading to a bellicose polyphonic development of the material. Variation V (coda) opens with a recapitulation of the two versions of the main theme, before the return of the motive leads to another fiercely dissonant clash. Cornelius interprets this passage as aiming towards "Not with something as simple as the victory of good over evil, but with an amalgamation of the two opposed forces into an absolute dominance". The work ends with a triumphal version of the main theme in F major on eight trumpets, which, according to Langgaard's indications, "are to be placed in such a way in the orchestra that their sound cuts shrilly through that of the orchestra."

== Premiere and reception ==
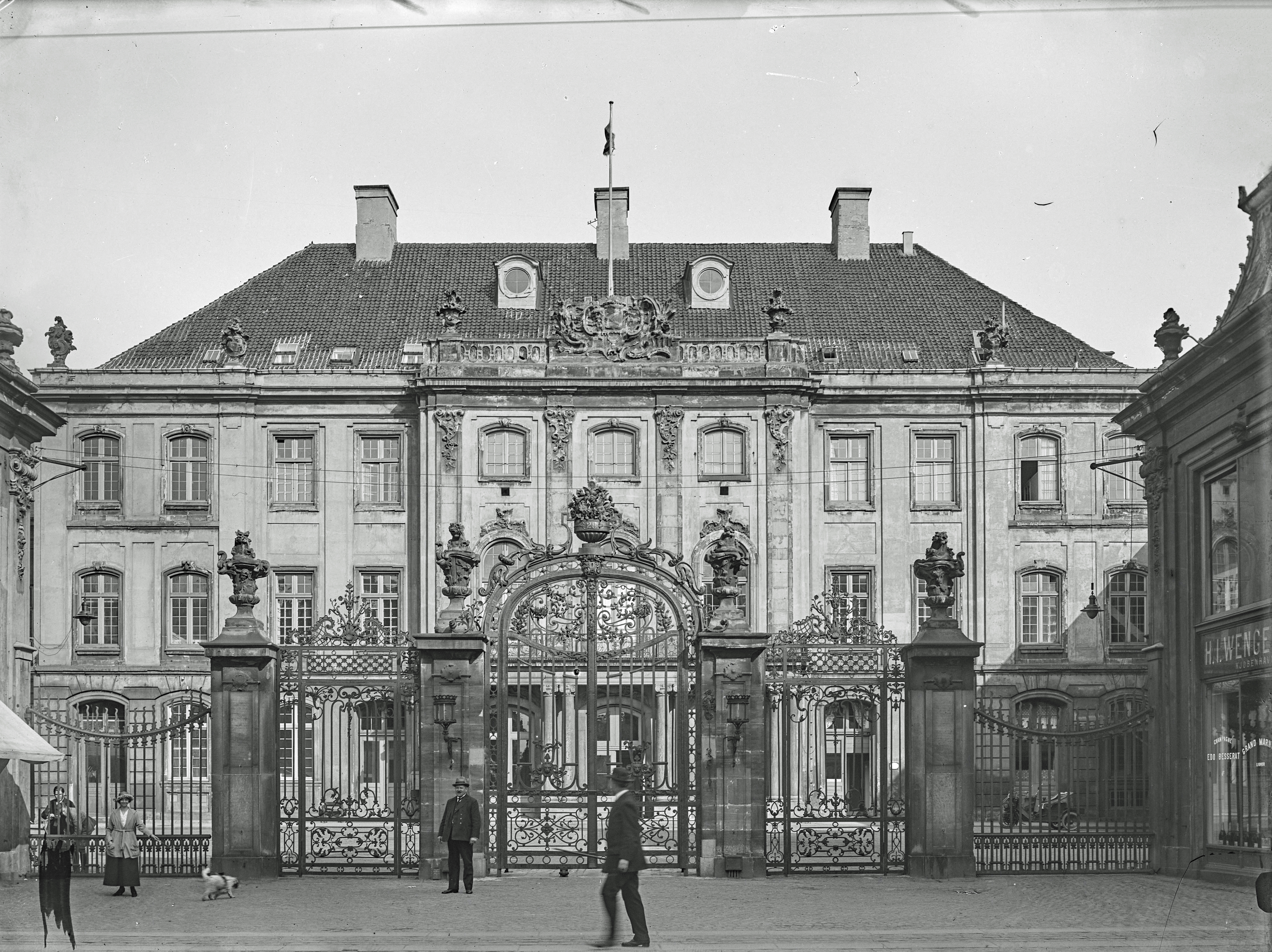
The Odd Fellows Mansion in Copenhagen (1920)

The symphony was premiered on 15 January 1923, at the Fest-halle in Karlsruhe with the Badisches Landestheater-Orchester, in a concert program shared with works by Otto Besch, Max von Schillings and Jean Paul Ertel. This first part was conducted by Hans Seeber van der Floe, after which Langgaard stepped on the podium to conduct his symphony. The work was a triumphant success, Langgaard being called back to the stage several times. Several reviews later reflected this success:

The strongest impression was left behind by the "Symphony in one Movement" by Rudolf Langgaard [sic], a young Danish composer. He is of a completely actively-oriented nature, headstrong, and above all chaste. A confidence-awakening picture of the future opened up: the musical youth of Karlsruhe gave the beautiful, full of character, extremely modern work enthusiastic ovations.

The first performance in Denmark took place on 26 September 1923 at the Odd Fellows Mansion, Copenhagen, performed by the Blüthner Orchestra conducted by Langgaard. He also directed the prelude of "Antichrist", which had recently been turned down for staging by the Royal Danish Theatre. The rest of the concert featured works by Liszt, Reinecke, as well as Tchaikovsky's Symphony No. 6, conducted by Camillo Hildebrand. While the opera prelude was well-received by the audience, the performance of the symphony turned into a scandal. Frejlif Olsen, editor of the Ekstra Bladet, reported what happened on 27 September 1923:

After the Antichrist overture Langgaard conducted an Antichrist symphony — and now everything went wrong. The audience abandoned themselves to one surprise after the other; along the rows of seats tittering, hissing, the gnashing of teeth and suppressed 'goodgriefs' could be heard [...] some groaned, others spat, an elderly lady collapsed and had to be carried out, and when the piece had finally come to an end, a violent booing and hissing could be heard throughout the concert hall, offended shrieks and outbursts of laughter drowned out a half-hearted applause. Rud Langgaard failed to understand what was going on - he thought he was being called forward, he stood up there on stage and waved and bowed with a bouquet of flowers in one hand.

Several other reviews severely criticised the composer and the piece; the symphony was described as incoherent, cacophonous and generally incomprehensible. Langgaard was also described as wasting his talents, and mad-like in his appearance. Only a single review from the Berlingske Tidende briefly recognized the efforts of Langgaard before echoing similar criticisms. A second performance at the Tivoli Concert Hall, where his second and fourth symphonies had been played, failed to materialize in 1924 due to the refusal of Frederik Schnedler-Petersen.

After the revisions were completed in 1930, the symphony was performed on 29 May 1935 at the State Radio studio in Axelborg, in a studio broadcast conducted by Launy Grøndahl, who became one of the few champions of Langgaard in Denmark. Two further radio performances took place on 28 December 1937 and 24 April 1941, both also directed by Grøndahl. After the work was published in 1946, a performance took place on 17 March 1949 at the concert hall of the Radiohuset, again under the baton of Grøndahl. This hall features an organ, which led Langgaard to add an optional organ part to the symphony. The concert had a mixed reception by critics. A review from the Nationaltidende stated that "perhaps Langgaard’s musical idiom is not completely in tune with our age, but it is nevertheless a profoundly original and artistically valuable work he has created here". Despite its poor initial reception in Denmark, the work was performed, recorded and broadcast multiple times afterwards.

== Assessment ==
The symphony has been generally well-received by music critics and reviewers. Terry Barfoot, in a review of MusicWeb International characterized the work as "an expressionist piece contrasting images of light and darkness, of harmony and dissonance". In another review from the same medium, Jonathan Woolf remarks that the symphony "is one of Langgaard’s most internationally performed symphonies". In another one, he offered the following comment:

The Heaven-Rending symphony stretches the sonic argument almost to breaking point in its amalgamation of the light and the dark. He revised it in 1928-30 but it contains some of his most radical music in form, content, and effect.

A review in Allmusic describes the piece as mystically intense and "free from conventional artifice". Gerald Fenech, in a review of Classical Net, praised the symphony for its rhythmic changes and explosive climaxes. Richard Whitehouse, in a review from Gramophone described the work as apocalyptic and emotionally tense. Robert Layton, in another review from the same medium remarked the work's eclectic and episodic nature, as well as a lack of "symphonic coherence".

A review found in ClassicsToday notes the following about the symphony: "a work in the basic mold of Nielsen’s 'Inextinguishable', but far shorter". In the same medium, classical music critic David Hurwitz described the piece as "music of Straussian refulgence". Jean-Yves Duperron, in a review of the Classical Music Sentinel, described the work as "one of the most astounding examples of clever thematic manipulation", comparing it to the finale of Gustav Mahler's Symphony No. 7, written between 1904–05.

This is a symphonic work highly charged with religious context. It gradually builds up to battles between good and evil of apocalyptic proportions, pushing all the groups of the orchestra to their maximum limits into a frighteningly grandiose clash of thematic material. It all ends with the return of the beautiful opening theme, which conclusively reigns over evil with a massive pipe organ joining ranks with the full orchestra to bathe the ending of the symphony in glorious light.

Jonathan Blumhofer, in a review found at The Arts Fuse, noted the chromatic and dissonant language as well as the score's contrapuntal and motivic complexity. Blumhofer also names composers like Richard Wagner, Paul Hindemith and Nielsen as influences. Malcolm Hayes, in a review of BBC Music Magazine, is more critical towards the work, ultimately remarking that "while the conception is coherent, the level of invention is not". Another review found in the same medium recognizes the symphony as the most recorded and visionary of Langgaard's cycle, with "music of real imagination and originality", but echoes similar criticism in regards to coherence.

== Recordings ==
The symphony is the most recorded of Langgaard's complete cycle of 16 symphonies.

Conductor	Orchestra	Recording Date	Formats	Labels	Catalogue ID	References
Martellius Lundquist	Danish National Symphony Orchestra	1961, released 2025	CD / Digital	Danacord Records	DACOCD 976	
John Frandsen	Danish Radio Symphony Orchestra	1977, released 1989	CD / Digital	Danacord Records	DACOCD 560	
Ilya Stupel	Arthur Rubinstein Philharmonic Orchestra	1991, released 1992	CD / Digital	Danacord Records	DACOCD 406	
Neeme Järvi	Danish National Symphony Orchestra	1991, released 1992	CD / Digital	Chandos Records	CHAN 9064	
Thomas Dausgaard	Danish National Radio Symphony Orchestra	1998, released 2001	LP / CD / Digital	Dacapo Records	8.224180	
Sakari Oramo	Vienna Philharmonic Orchestra	2017, released 2018	CD / Digital	Dacapo Records	6.220653	
