= Symphony No. 1 (Langgaard) =

Symphony by Rued Langgaard

- "Klippepastoraler"
- by Rued Langgaard
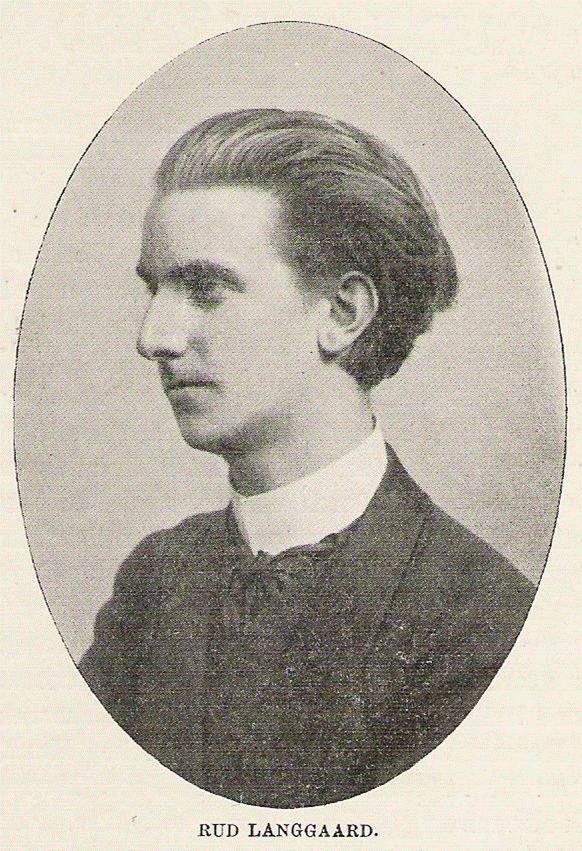
- Rued Langgaard in 1917
- Catalogue: BVN. 32
- Duration: 60 minutes
- Movements: 5

Premiere
- Date: 1913
- Conductor: Max Fiedler

Danish composer Rued Langgaard completed his Symphony No. 1 "Klippepastoraler" (Cliffside Pastorals), BVN. 32 when he was just 17 years old. Despite initially being seen as unplayable by Langgaard's contemporaries due to its difficulty and grand scale, the work's 1913 premiere, given by the Berlin Philharmonic under the baton of German conductor Max Fiedler, was well received.

== Analysis ==
Langgaard's Symphony No. 1 is compositionally and structurally similar to the works of Richard Wagner, Pyotr Ilyich Tchaikovsky, Anton Bruckner, and Richard Strauss due to its rich orchestration, lush melodies, and considerable length. As indicated by the titles of the 5 movements and the symphony's subtitle, Symphony No. 1 describes a journey from the foot to the summit of a mountain. A typical performance lasts roughly 60 minutes.

== Movements ==
There are five movements:

1. Brændinger og Solglimt (Surf and Glimpses of Sun)
2. Fjeldblomster (Mountain Flowers)
3. Sagn (Legend)
4. Opad Fjeldet (Mountain Ascent)
5. Livsmod (Courage)

== Instrumentation ==
Symphony No. 1 "Klippepastoraler" is scored for a large orchestra consisting of 3 flutes (1 doubling piccolo), 3 oboes (1 doubling cor anglais), 3 clarinets, 3 bassoons, 8 horns (4 doubling Wagner tubas), 3 trumpets, 3 trombones, bass trombone, tuba, 7 timpani (2 players), cymbals, triangle, tam-tam, snare drum, 2 harps and strings. Additionally, a brass choir (3 trumpets, 2 trombones, bass trombone, and tuba) is employed in the 5th movement.

== Performance history ==
The symphony is rarely performed, but has been championed by Finnish conductor Sakari Oramo, who gave this work its first Berlin Philharmonic performance since the 1913 premiere on June 18, 2022. Earlier that year, on April 8, 2022, Oramo conducted the work with the BBC Symphony Orchestra. The work has also been performed by conductor Jahbom Koo and the Korean Symphony Orchestra.

== Notable recordings ==
- Thomas Dausgaard and the Danish National Symphony Orchestra
- Sakari Oramo and the Berlin Philharmonic Orchestra
