= Josef Wolfsthal =

Austrian violinist and professor (1899 - 1931)

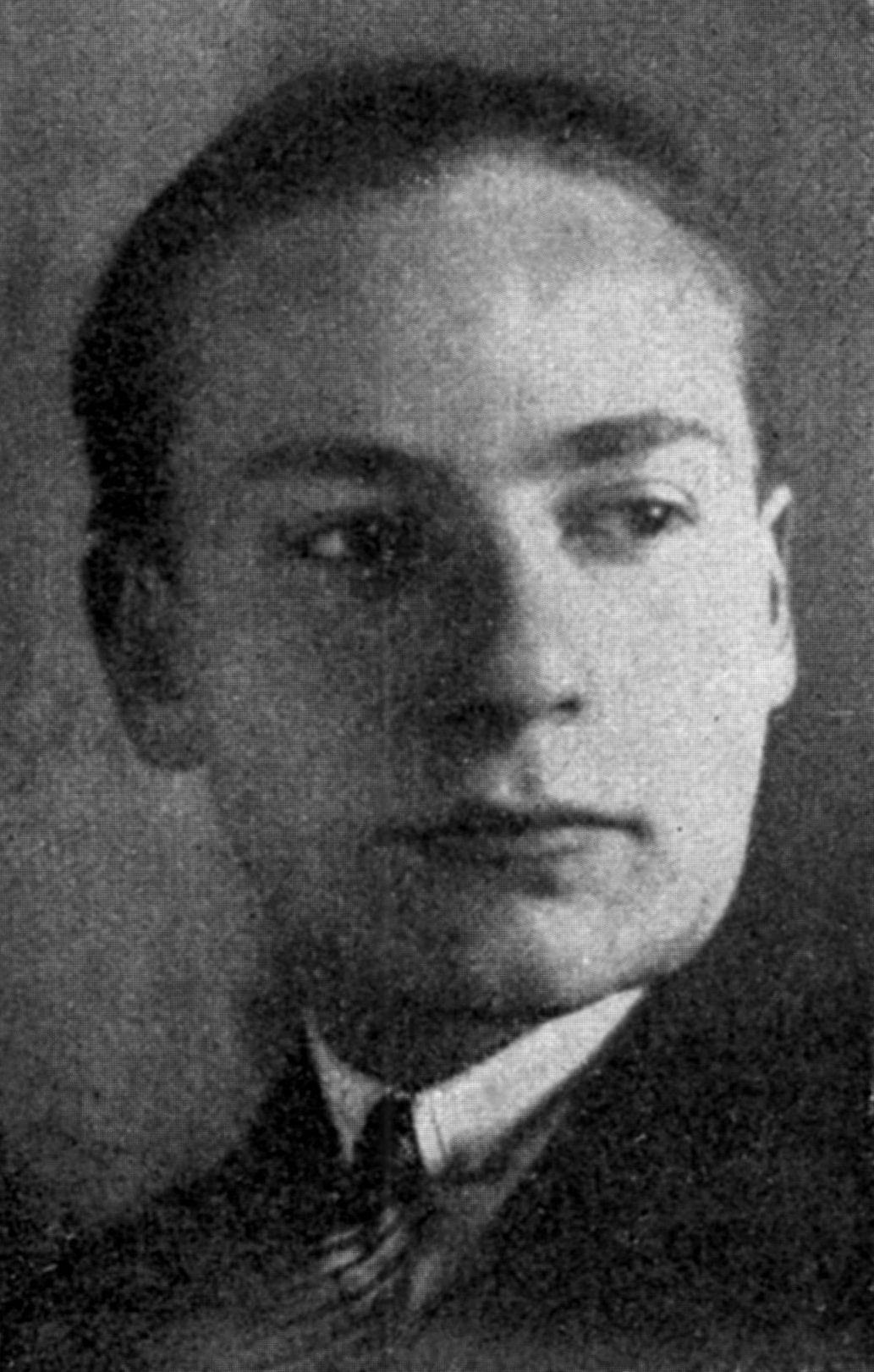
Josef Wolfsthal in Berlin, Germany, circa 1924

Josef Wolfsthal (12 June 1899 – 3 February 1931), born as Josef Wolfthal, was an Austrian violinist and a professor in Germany's capital Berlin.

He was born into a musical family in Vienna. It was of Galician origin. His father and his older brother Max (born 1896) both played the violin. His father was an excellent violin teacher, and gave his sons their first lessons on that instrument. He also taught Sigmund Feuermann (1900–1952). From the age of 10, Wolfsthal studied for six years with famed Hungarian violin teacher Carl Flesch, and at age 16 started to perform in public. His debut was on 7 April 1916 with Berliner Philharmoniker conducted by Camillo Hildebrand (1876–1953). There he performed the Concerto for 2 Violins in D minor, BWV 1043 by Johann Sebastian Bach with his teacher Carl Flesch, who then encouraged him to gain some experience as an orchestral player to make him a more disciplined ensemble player. In that capacity, he played in the first performance of Ein Heldenleben by Richard Strauss, and in the first recording of Molière's Le bourgeois gentilhomme by Strauss, conducted by the composer in Berlin (see below).

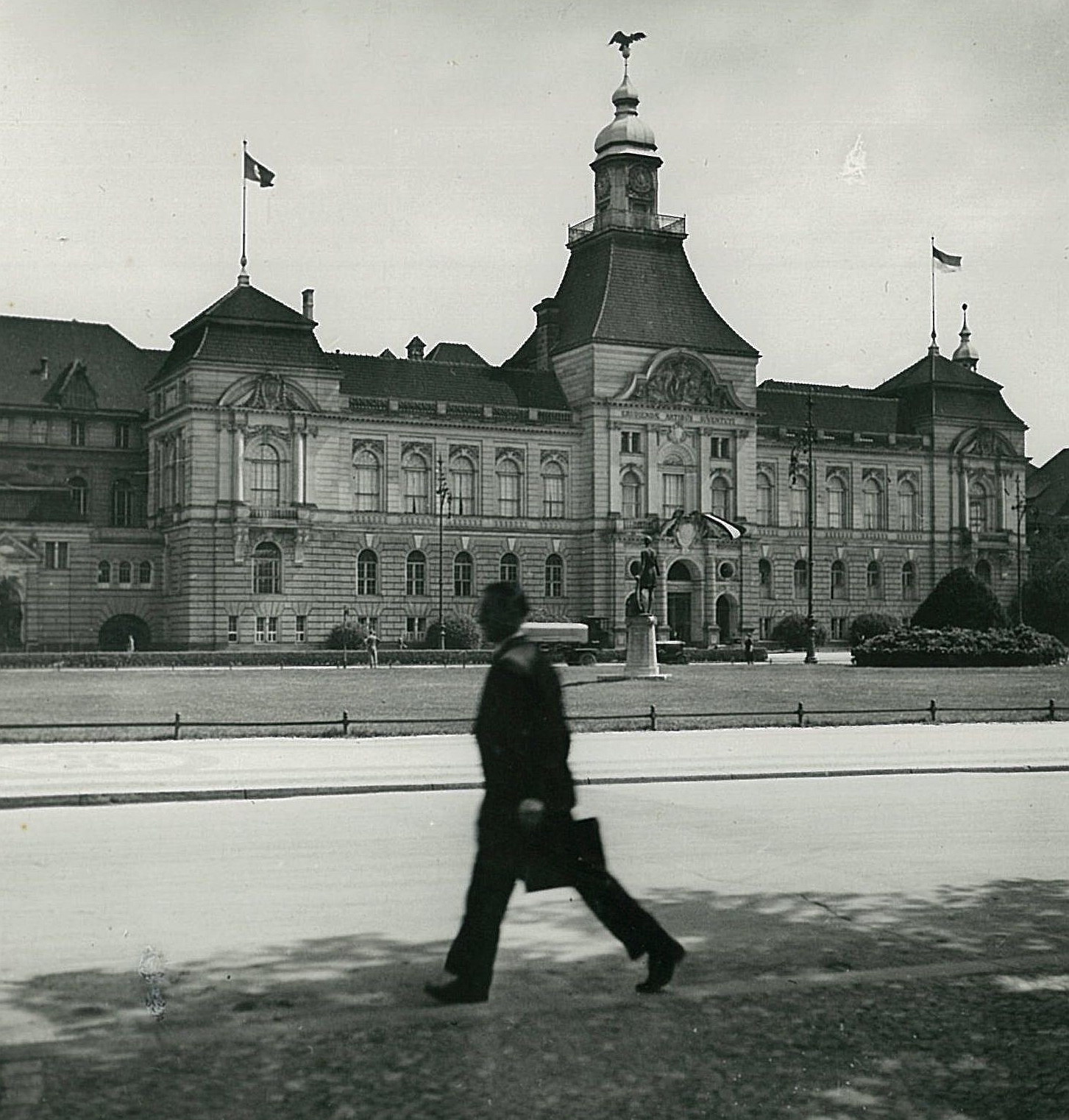
Academy of Music in Berlin in 1928, where Wolfsthal was a professor between 1926 and 1931

Wolfsthal then moved to Bremen, where he succeeded Georg Kulenkampff (1898–1948) as concertmaster. Later he moved to the Swedish capital Stockholm and then back to Berlin as concertmaster of one of the two outstanding orchestras in the German capital in the interwar period, the Berlin State Opera orchestra (the Berlin Philharmonic Orchestra was the other), where he became a protégé of Richard Strauss, who often conducted this orchestra (see above). When he was only 26, he was made a violin professor at Music Academy in Berlin. Some of his students were Szymon Goldberg (1909–1993) and Marianne Liedtke, who later named herself Maria Lidka (1914–2013) after emigrating to United Kingdom.

Wolfsthal gave the premiere of Karl Weigl's 1928 Violin Concerto. He played in a distinguished string trio with cellist Emmanuel Feuermann and violist and composer Paul Hindemith in which his pupil Goldberg succeeded him after his death and led the group in recordings for Columbia of Beethoven's Serenade Op. 8 and Hindemith's String Trio No. 2.

Wolfsthal had already made some recordings in the 1920s. In 1928, he became deputy head of orchestra of Krolloper Berlin, which was led by Otto Klemperer. There he took part in the premiere of Kammermusik No. 5, op. 36 no. 4 by Hindemith. He formed a trio with pianist Leonid Kreutzer and cellist Gregor Piatigorsky. The latter recommended him as a violin teacher to the young Marianne Liedtke. But when Wolfsthal was engaged to accompany young piano virtuoso Vladimir Horowitz, his lack of discipline betrayed him when, while performing for Piatigorsky's manager, he abruptly stopped accompanying in midstream and started to improvise, laughing boyishly.

He married Olga, the former wife of George Szell, who bore him a daughter. After attending a funeral in Berlin in the winter of 1930, he caught a cold which escalated to pneumonia several weeks later and took his life at only 31. His wife later married the cellist Benar Heifetz (1899–1974).

Wolfsthal's sound has been described as "tightly concentrated" and "sweet"; his style—which eschewed portamenti—as having a "spruce modernity". Reviewing Wolfsthal's 1929 recording of Beethoven's Violin Concerto, the Penguin guide to compact discs wrote of his "breathtaking mastery, making one regret that this pupil of Carl Flesch died in his early thirties."
