= Subcontrabass tuba =

Very low pitched instrument in the tuba family

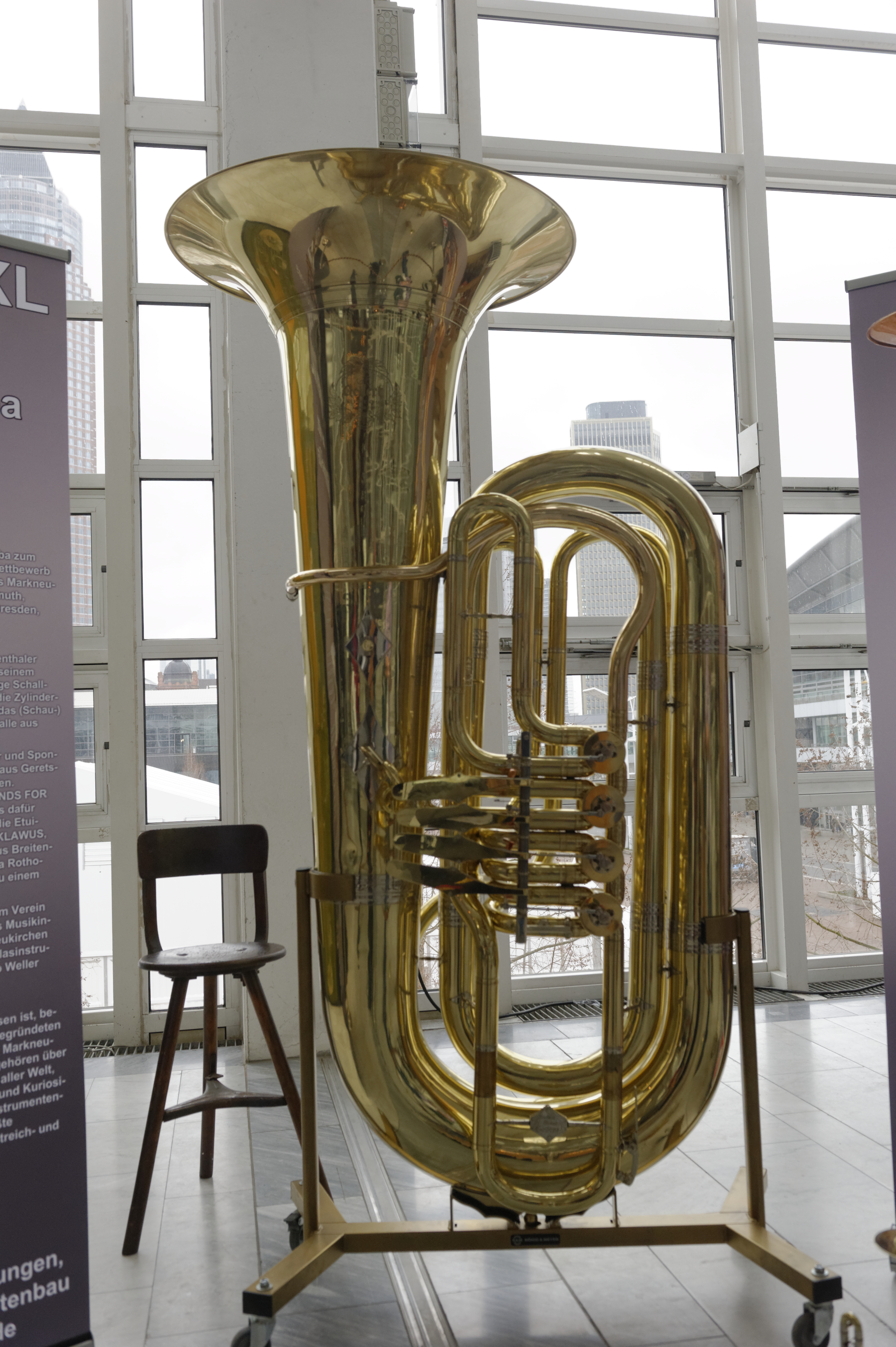
- Riesentuba in 36′ B♭, Markneukirchen Music Museum

Brass instrument
- Classification: Aerophone; Wind; Brass
- Hornbostel–Sachs classification: 423.231.2 (Valved labrosone with wide conical bore)

Related instruments
- Tuba; Foghorn

Musicians
- Gerard Hoffnung

Builders
- Historical: Adolphe Sax; Gustave Auguste Besson; Bohland & Fuchs; Rudolf Sander

The subcontrabass tuba is a rare instrument of the tuba family built an octave or more below the modern contrabass tuba. Only a very small number of these large novelty instruments have ever been built. Most are pitched in thirty-six-foot (36′) BBB♭ an octave lower than the BB♭ contrabass tuba, their fundamental (pedal) note B♭_{-1} corresponding to a frequency of 15 Hz, below the threshold of human hearing.

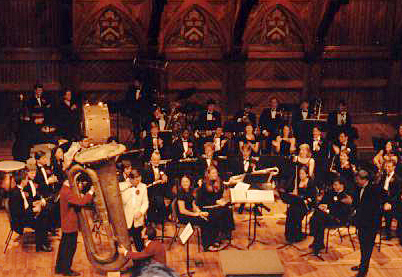
The Harvard University Band's Besson La Prodigieuse BBB♭ tuba

== History ==
The first instrument of this sort was designed by the Paris-based instrument maker Adolphe Sax. He built a bourdon saxhorn in 52′ E♭ and exhibited it at the Paris Exposition Universelle of 1867, although there is evidence that it was in fact built some years earlier, and possibly appeared at the 1851 Great Exhibition in London.

An instrument built in 36′ BBB♭ by the French instrument maker Gustave Auguste Besson was brought to the United States by Carl Fischer on the suggestion of the American bandmaster Patrick Gilmore, who planned to tour with it in 1893. It is now owned by the Harvard University Band, who have restored it and feature it occasionally in their concerts.

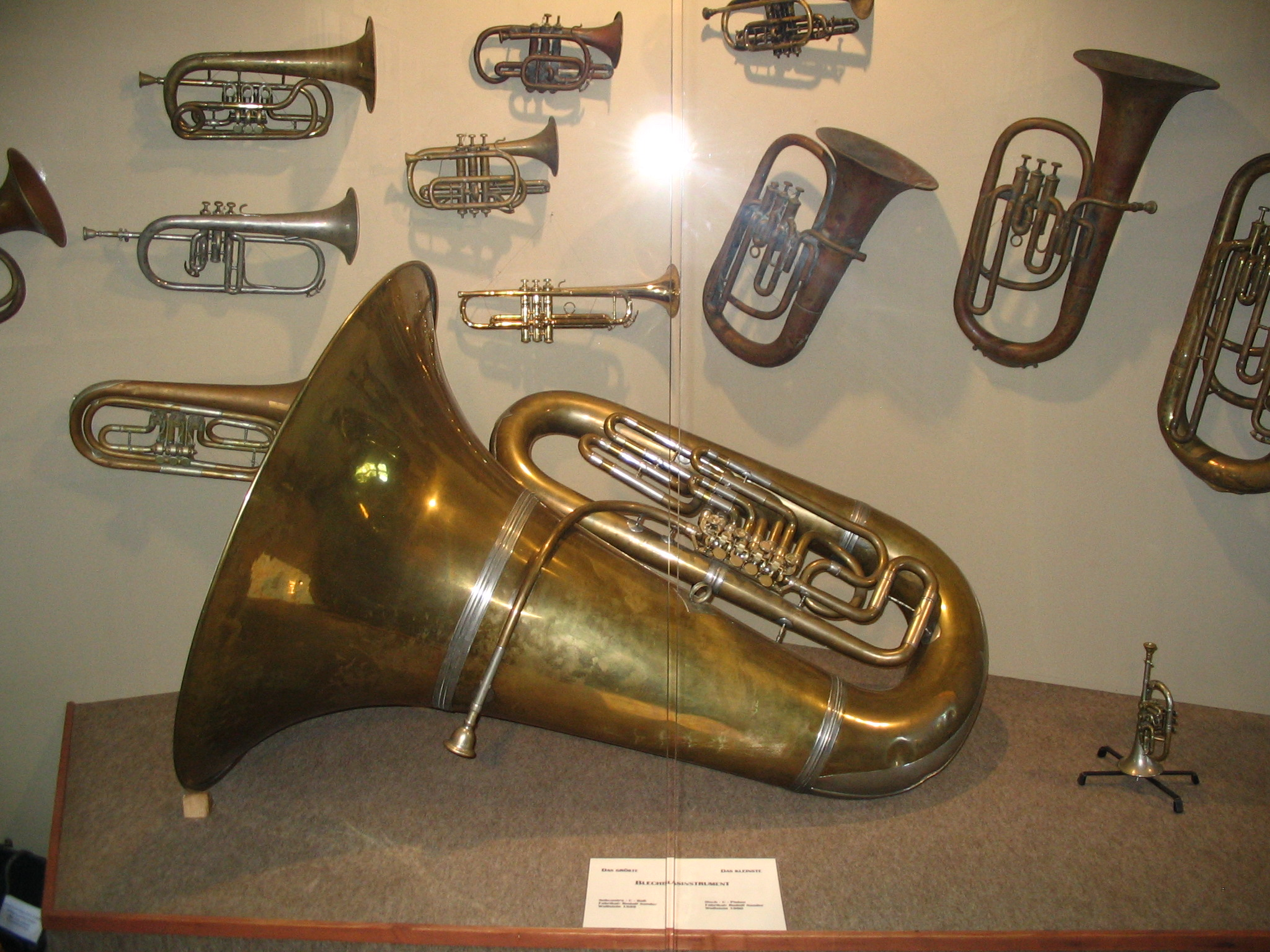
Subcontrabass tuba in C by Rudolph Sander, 1899, in the Musikantenland Museum.

In 1956, the British musician Gerard Hoffnung used one of the two 32′ CCC subcontrabass tubas built c. 1899 by the German maker Rudolf Sander in the first of his comedic Hoffnung Music Festivals. He commissioned a work for it, Variations on "Annie Laurie" by Gordon Jacob, which he performed in the festival. Another in BBB♭ was made in Kraslice by Bohland & Fuchs, probably during 1910 or 1911 and destined for New York in 1913. This tuba is playable but two players are needed: one to operate the valves, and one to blow into the mouthpiece. In 2010, a fully playable Riesentuba in 36′ BBB♭ with four rotary valves was built and resides in the Markneukirchen Musical Instrument Museum, Germany.

On the other extant examples, the valve tubing was intentionally built to be non-functional; they are made to look like tubas, but are essentially giant bugles that can only play a single harmonic series. One such display instrument, built by Besson, survives at the Horniman Museum in London, after spending several decades as the shop sign for Boosey & Hawkes. Two instruments were built by Bohland & Fuchs in Bohemia in 1912 for Carl Fischer's New York and Chicago stores. The Chicago instrument was scrapped in 1942 for the World War II war effort, and the New York instrument, nick-named "Big Carl", is still owned by Carl Fischer Music.
