= Maria Lidka =

German violinist (1914–2013)

Maria Lidka (27 May 1914–12 December 2013) was a German-born classical violinist.

She was born Marianne Louise Liedtke in Berlin into a highly cultured Jewish family. Her father was an appellate court lawyer, a role he lost in April 1933 with the rise of the Nazis. She was a student of Josef Wolfsthal and Max Rostal. She fled to London in 1934 and taught German and violin lessons, as well as performing with the pianist Peter Gellhorn and her housemate, cellist Eva Heinitz. In 1939, she played at London's Wigmore Hall. In 1941, she joined the Czech Trio alongside Walter Susskind and Karel Horitz. To sound Czech, she changed her name to Maria Lidka.

After the war, she performed work by a number of contemporary British composers including Franz Reizenstein, Michael Tippett, Richard Rodney Bennett, Peter Racine Fricker and Kenneth Leighton, as well as working with Benjamin Britten and performing with the Reizenstein Trio and the London String Trio. She also appeared on BBC radio on the Third Programme and in the Proms.

In 1955, she married Walter May, a Jewish emigrant businessman from Cologne with which she had two sons. Walter's brother Edward was a prominent cellist. Walter died in 1963. Lidka became Professor of Violin at the Royal College of Music in London, a role she served in from 1963 to 1985.
