= Music of the Spheres (Langgaard) =

Multi-movement orchestral work by Rued Langgaard (1918)

- by Rued Langgaard
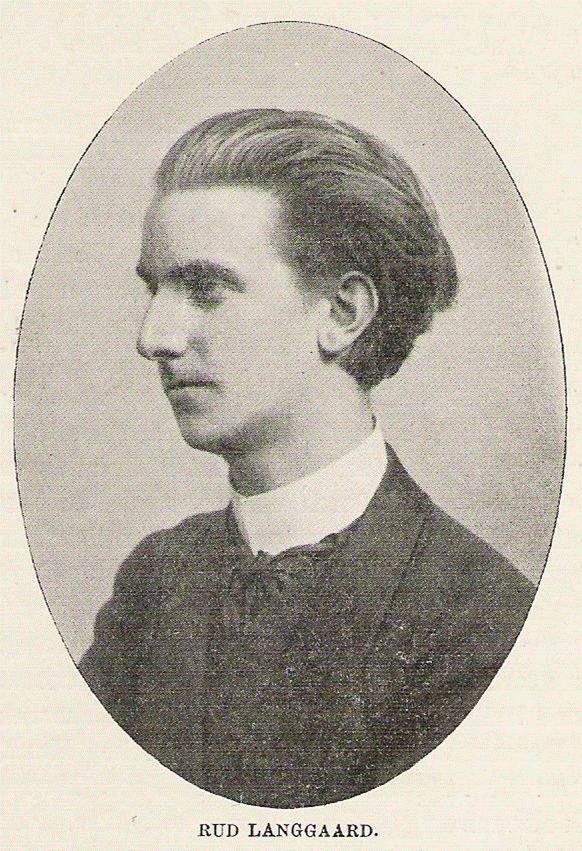
- The composer in 1917
- Native name: Sfærernes Musik
- Catalogue: BVN 128
- Language: Danish
- Composed: 1916–1918
- Publisher: Hansen (1919)
- Duration: 35 mins.

Premiere
- Date: 26 November 1921
- Location: Karlsruhe, Germany
- Conductor: Hans Seeber van der Floe
- Performers: Badisches Landestheater-Orchester & Choir; Ellen Overgaard (soprano)

Music of the Spheres (in Danish: Sfærernes Musik), BVN 128, is a multi-movement composition for soprano, mixed choir, orchestra (including a second, smaller "orchestra at a distance"), and organ written from 1916 to 1918 by the Danish composer Rued Langgaard. The piece was inspired by a line from a Danish poem translated as, "The stars seem to twinkle kindly at us, yet the writing of the stars is cold and merciless."

== Analysis ==
The work incorporates innovations that were ahead of their time, including some of the earliest examples of string piano (playing directly on the strings of the piano). The piece's extensive use of slow-moving string clusters prompted the composer György Ligeti to proclaim himself a "Langgaard-epigone" when presented with the score in the late 1960s.

According to the music researcher Eric Christensen – in an analysis of works utilizing the "spatial dimension" as a fundamental concept – the space of Music of the Spheres is limited at the upper level by repeated lines of high notes on the violins and flutes, and at the lower level by timpani and deep horns. In between it is filled out with clusters and polyphonic tonal surfaces that remove the sense of time moving forward. Instead, it makes time "acutely present" by accelerating repetitive patterns. The form of the work is accumulative and concludes with a vision of "the end of all things" expressed with stark musical contrast, such as violent music followed by noisy "anti-music" (produced by cymbals and kettle-drums) juxtaposed with "heavenly" music with angel choirs and the sound of harps.

== Instrumentation ==
The following instruments and voices are positioned on-stage:

- soprano, mixed choir (SSAATTBB)
- 4 flutes (fourth doubling on piccolo), 3 oboes, cor anglais, 3 clarinets (in B♭), and 3 bassoons
- 8 horns (in F; sixth and seventh sometimes in C), 3 trumpets (in B♭), 3 trombones, and tuba
- 8 timpani (4 players), cymbals, tam-tam, and tubular bells.
- Choir organ, grand organ, and "glissando-piano" (string piano)
- Strings

In addition, several instrumentalists are positioned off-stage as the so-called "orchestra at a distance":

- 2 flutes, 1 oboe, 2 clarinets (in B♭), and 1 horn (in F)
- Timpani
- Strings (3 violins, 2 violas, 1 cello, and 1 contrabass) and harp

== Performances ==
Music of the Spheres received its premiere performance on 26 November 1921 in the Konzerthaus, Karlsruhe, Germany, with Ellen Overgaard (soprano), Badisches Landestheater-Orchester and Choir, conducted by Hans Seeber-van der Floe. The premiere was a success, but the following year it received a more lukewarm reception when performed in Berlin. It was not performed again until 1968, where a performance in Stockholm with the Royal Stockholm Philharmonic Orchestra, conducted by Sergiu Comissiona, ignited a renaissance for Langgaard's music.

The first performance in Denmark took place in 1969 in "Rundhøjhallen" in Holme with Aarhus Symphony Orchestra and Choir, conducted by Per Dreier. Unfortunately the soprano soloist, Margrethe Danielsen, did not make it in time for the concert. In 1971, a reduced version was performed in Copenhagen, but the first complete performance in Denmark, all forces present, took place in 1980 in the concert hall of Radiohuset with Edith Guillaume (soprano), and the Danish National Symphony Orchestra and Choir, conducted by John Frandsen.

In 2010, Music of the Spheres received its British premiere at the BBC Proms, with the Danish National Symphony Orchestra and Choir, conducted by Thomas Dausgaard.

A performance lasts around 35 minutes.

== Recordings ==
The first recording of Music of the Spheres was made in 1968 at the Nordic Music Days in Stockholm with Berit Lindholm (soprano), Akademiska Kören (The Stockholm Academic Choir), and the Royal Stockholm Philharmonic Orchestra, conducted by Sergiu Comissiona. A 22-minute excerpt of the work was released on LP the following year by HMV/EMI (CSDS 1087). The first complete recording was released on the Danish label Danacord (DACOCD 206) in 1983 with Edith Guillaume and the Danish National Symphony Orchestra and Choir, conducted by John Frandsen.

Another two recordings, until the present moment, were released with Gitta-Maria Sjöberg, Danish National Symphony Orchestra and Choir, conducted by Gennady Rozhdestvensky, by Chandos CHAN 9517 (1997), and another with Inger Dam Jensen, Danish National Symphony Orchestra, Danish National Choir and Danish National Vocal Ensemble, conducted by Thomas Dausgaard (Dacapo 6.220535, 2010), both setting the complete work.
