= Gerard Hoffnung =

- Born: Gerhard Hoffnung; 22 March 1925; Berlin, Germany
- Died: 28 September 1959 (aged 34); Hampstead, London, England
- Occupations: Illustrator, musician
- Musical career
- Instrument: Tuba

Gerard Hoffnung (22 March 1925 – 28 September 1959) was an artist and musician, best known for his humorous works.

Raised in Germany, Hoffnung was brought to London as a boy to escape the Nazis. Over the next two decades in England, he became known as a cartoonist, tuba player, impresario, broadcaster and raconteur.

After training at two art colleges, Hoffnung taught for a few years, and then turned to drawing, on the staff of English and American publications, and later as a freelance. He published a series of cartoons on musical themes, and illustrated the works of novelists and poets.

In 1956 Hoffnung mounted the first of his "Hoffnung Festivals" in London, at which classical music was spoofed for comic effect, with contributions from many eminent musicians. As a broadcaster he appeared on BBC panel games, most notably 'One Minute Please' (the forerunner of 'Just a Minute'), where he honed the material for one of his best-known performances, his speech at the Oxford Union in 1958.

== Early years ==
Born in Berlin, (Note: It was Hoffnung's practice to assert that he was born at the age of two.) and named Gerhard, Hoffnung was the only child of Jewish parents, Hildegard and Ludwig Hoffnung. He was sent to England, where he attended Bunce Court School in 1938. In 1939, his parents left Germany; his father went to Palestine to enter the family's banking business. Gerard went with his mother to London, where she rented a house in Hampstead Garden Suburb, where Hoffnung lived for the rest of his life. In 1939 he enrolled at Highgate School, where, according to one biographer, he was "remembered for his anarchic spirit". Among the artists he most admired when he was growing up was Walter Trier, long associated with Lilliput magazine. Hoffnung had his first cartoon published in the same publication while he was still at school.

After leaving Highgate, Hoffnung studied at Hornsey College of Art, but was expelled for his lack of gravity in the life class. (Note: Hoffnung, according to The Guardian, "drew the supercilious expression and the ungainly body of a model in the life class, surrounded by the fixed subservient stare of students behind canvases.") He then attended Harrow School of Art, after which he became a schoolmaster. He was art master at Stamford School (1945–46) and assistant art master at Harrow School (1948), with an intervening and overlapping spell as a staff artist on the London Evening News. He was a staff artist to Cowles Magazines Inc in New York in 1950, and otherwise pursued a career as a freelance cartoonist. He contributed to Punch, The Strand Magazine and The Tatler, and to other British, continental, and American magazines. He also produced advertising work for Kia-Ora, Guinness, and other companies. He presented one-man exhibitions of his work, including one at the Little Gallery, Piccadilly (1949), and two at the Royal Festival Hall (1951 and 1956).

== Musical drawings ==
In the words of his biographer Richard Ingrams, Hoffnung

developed a distinctive style which owed something to the German illustrator Wilhelm Busch. He mainly drew with a mapping pen and Indian ink, and also used watercolours and wax crayons. His illustrations in colour for Colette's libretto for Ravel's opera L'enfant et les sortilèges were outstanding. (Note: These drawings were displayed at the Festival Hall to coincide with the first English performance of the opera, under Victor de Sabata in 1951.)

Much of Hoffnung's humour centred on the world of music, particularly the various instruments of the orchestra with which he was fascinated. He published a series of books of cartoons poking gentle fun at conductors and orchestral instrumentalists. Examples include the drawing of a musician being devoured by the serpent he is trying to play; another shows a singer whose waistcoat buttons are control knobs labelled On/off, ppp/fff, Wobble, and Sobs. He depicted Malcolm Sargent as "Elegantemente", conducting with a full-length mirror at the front of his rostrum. After Hoffnung's death, some of the cartoons were turned into short animated films by Halas and Batchelor with music by Francis Chagrin in the television series Tales from Hoffnung (1965).

== Broadcasts and concerts ==
In 1950 Hoffnung began a career as a broadcaster for the BBC, as both raconteur and regular contestant in panel games including One Minute Please, the predecessor of Just a Minute. He was, in the words of Ingrams, "a brilliant improviser with a dry wit and a masterly sense of timing".

Probably the best-known example of Hoffnung as a humorous speaker is an account of a bricklayer's misfortunes when lowering some bricks in a barrel from the top of a building. It was part of a speech to the Oxford Union on 4 December 1958. The derivation of the story is confused, but it first arises in the 1930s. It was published in Reader's Digest in 1940 as a letter from a naval officer who had supposedly received it from an enlisted man explaining his late return from leave. Hoffnung first saw the story in The Manchester Guardian in 1957; the version printed there is identical with the text used by Hoffnung, except for the location, which he changed from Barbados to Golders Green. Hoffnung used the piece to warm up the audience before each recording session of One Minute, Please. In these performances he perfected the timing before the Oxford Union speech. The story was part of his speech in a debate called Life Begins at 38 and was recorded by the BBC. The tale itself was not, Richard Ingrams comments, especially funny, but "[Hoffnung's] manner and delivery reduced his audience to hysterics".

Excerpt from "The Bricklayer"
Excerpt from The Bricklayer – 266 kb

The tale was later cast into music as The Sick Note by Pat Cooksey, versions of which were popularized by several other performers including Seán Cannon and The Dubliners.

Among Hoffnung's other well-known subjects were his supposedly helpful advice to tourists in London ("Have you tried the famous echo in the Reading Room of the British Museum?") and allegedly genuine letters in fallible English from continental hoteliers ("There is a French widow in every bedroom affording delightful prospects").

In 1956 Hoffnung took part in one of the popular "April Fool's" concerts in Liverpool, organised by Fritz Spiegl. He took up the idea, and presented a similar, but larger-scale, concert at the Festival Hall in November the same year, in which Spiegl joined him. The 1956 "Hoffnung Music Festival" played to a sell-out audience in the hall and to BBC viewers throughout Britain. The success of this concert led to two more Hoffnung Festivals, the second in 1958 and the third in 1961, presented as a tribute after his death. They featured contributions from distinguished musicians. Donald Swann revised Haydn's Surprise Symphony to make it considerably more surprising. Malcolm Arnold wrote A Grand, Grand Overture, scored for orchestra and vacuum cleaners, and dedicated to US President Hoover. (Note: Annetta Hoffnung recalled in 2009, "His new overture posed a problem, because, as well as full orchestra and organ, it called for three vacuum cleaners, a floor polisher and four rifles. The vacuum cleaners had to be in B flat and the floor polisher in G, and Gerard and Malcolm spent days trying to find just the right ones.") Franz Reizenstein's Concerto Popolare featured a battle between the soloist, playing the Grieg Piano Concerto, and the orchestra, determinedly playing Tchaikovsky. Sir William Walton conducted a one-note excerpt from his cantata Belshazzar's Feast: the word "Slain!" shouted by the chorus. After Hoffnung's death, similar concerts were promoted by his widow, Annetta, and collaborators.

Hoffnung learned to play the tuba well enough to play the solo part in the Tuba Concerto by Vaughan Williams in a serious concert at the Festival Hall, and was an active participant in Morley College Orchestra, a respected amateur ensemble in London. He also played in the premiere of Malcolm Arnold's Toy Symphony at the Savoy Hotel on 28 November 1957.

== Personal life ==
In 1952 Hoffnung married Annetta Perceval, née Bennett; they had two children, Ben (Benedict) and Emily who became, respectively, a timpanist and a sculptor. Hoffnung's uncle was Bruno Adler, a German art historian and writer who, during the war, wrote for the German language department of the BBC.

In addition to his public persona as an eccentric and wit, Hoffnung had a deeply serious and moral side. He joined the Quakers in 1955 and was active in their prisoner visiting scheme. According to a biographical sketch by Joel Marks, first published in Essays in Arts and Sciences (University of New Haven, Volume XXI, 10/1992), "Hoffnung's outlook on race relations, homosexuality, nuclear disarmament, the treatment of animals (especially hunting) and, for that matter, the music of Bartók and Schoenberg [was] liberal and impassioned." A week before he died he took part in a show at the Festival Hall in aid of the Campaign for Nuclear Disarmament, along with Peggy Ashcroft, Benjamin Britten, C. Day Lewis, Michael Redgrave and others.

== Death and legacy ==
Hoffnung collapsed at his home on 25 September 1959, and died of a cerebral haemorrhage three days later in New End Hospital in Hampstead at the age of thirty-four. The obituarist in The Times concluded:

Hoffnung was among other things an artist, a musician, a linguist, a raconteur, a Quaker, a bon viveur, a prison visitor and a mime. It is usual to say that a man has left behind a gap that cannot be filled. For Gerard Hoffnung there would be needed a handful of men, all of them greatly gifted.

Posthumous exhibitions of Hoffnung's work include those at the Berlin Festival (1964); the Brighton and Edinburgh festivals (1968); the Lincoln Center for the Performing Arts, New York (1970); the Royal Festival Hall (1984); and Orleans House Gallery, Twickenham, London (1992).

A memorial tribute, O Rare Hoffnung was published in 1960 and included contributions from Malcolm Arnold, John Dankworth, William Mann, Ian Messiter, Gerald Priestland, Donald Swann and nineteen others. Hoffnung's widow published a biography of him in 1988. In 2009, BBC Radio 4 broadcast Hoffnung – Drawn to Music, a comedy drama written by Alan Stafford which featured Matt Lucas as Hoffnung and Gina McKee as Annetta, with a cameo appearance by the real Annetta Hoffnung. In 1996 Humphrey Lyttelton recorded a portrait of Hoffnung entitled Hoffnung At Large for BBC Audiobooks, written by Judith Liddell-King.

== Recordings ==
- The Hoffnung Music Festival Concert (1956)
- The Hoffnung Interplanetary Music Festival (1958)
- Hoffnung at the Oxford Union (1960)
- The Hoffnung Astronautical Music Festival (1961)
- The Importance of Being Hoffnung (1968)
- Timeless Hoffnung (1970)
- Hoffnung (1973)
- Hoffnung's Music Festivals (1974)
- The Best of Hoffnung (1974)
- The Hoffnung Festival of Music (1988)
- Hoffnung's Music Festivals (1989)
- Hoffnung: A Last Encore (2002)

== Books ==
=== Drawings on musical subjects ===
- The Maestro (1953)
- The Hoffnung Symphony Orchestra (1955)
- The Hoffnung Music Festival (1956)
- The Hoffnung Companion to Music (1957)
- Hoffnung's Musical Chairs (1958)
- Hoffnung's Acoustics (1959)

The above six volumes were reissued as a uniform set in 2002 with forewords by Sir Simon Rattle, Peter Ustinov, Ronald Searle, Harry Enfield, Ian Hislop, and Hoffnung's daughter, Emily.

=== Other drawings, and posthumously published collections ===
- Ho Ho Hoffnung (1958)
- Birds, Bees and Storks (1960)
- Hoffnung's Little Ones (1961) (a republication of illustrations originally accompanying Elizabeth Pakenham's 'Points for Parents')
- Hoffnung's Constant Readers (1962)
- Hoffnung's Encore (1968) (contains illustrations from Punch magazine and Glyndebourne Festival Opera, many in colour)
- Young Hoffnung – the early drawings of Gerard Hoffnung, 5 to 18 years (1984)
- Hoffnung's Happy Hamper (2002)

=== Illustrator ===
- The Right Playmate (by James Broughton, 1951)
- Points for Parents (by Elizabeth Longford, 1954) (these illustrations were collected and republished posthumously as 'Hoffnung's Little Ones')
- Bouverie Ballads (by Percy Cudlipp, 1955)
- The Isle of Cats (by John Symonds, 1955)
- Reigning Cats and Dogs (by Stanley Penn, 1959)
- The Boy and the Magic (1964) (These are Hoffnung's 1951 illustrations for Ravel's opera L'enfant et les sortilèges. The illustrations had first been displayed at the Royal Festival Hall in 1951, the year that the hall opened, and are some of Hoffnung's earliest mature published illustrations. They were republished posthumously in 1964 to accompany a new English translation of Colette's libretto, by Christopher Fry, entitled 'The Boy and the Magic'.)

== Notes and references ==
Notes

== Sources ==
- Hoffnung, Gerard (1963). The Penguin Hoffnung. Harmondsworth: Penguin. OCLC 68600959.
