= Rued Langgaard =

Danish composer (1893–1952)

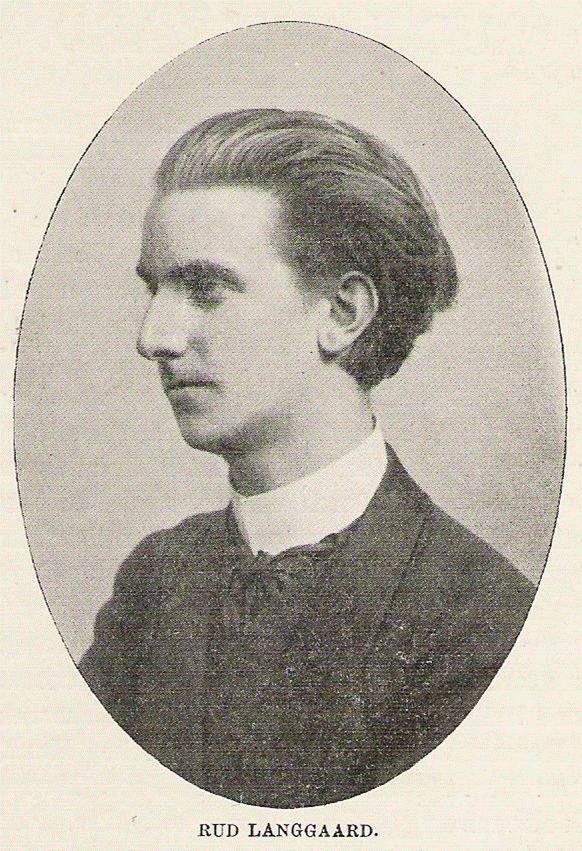
- Photograph from Gerhardt Lynge: Danske Komponister (1917)
- Born: Rud Immanuel Langgaard; 28 July 1893; Copenhagen, Denmark
- Died: 10 July 1952 (aged 58); Ribe, Denmark
- Resting place: Holmen Cemetery, Copenhagen
- Occupations: Composer and organist
- Known for: Composing numerous full works at a young age and having a more unconventional style compared to his counterparts.

Rued Langgaard (Danish: [ˈʁuðˀ ˈlɑŋˌkɒˀ]; born Rud Immanuel Langgaard; 28 July 1893 – 10 July 1952) was a late-Romantic Danish composer and organist. His then-unconventional music was at odds with that of his Danish contemporaries but was recognized 16 years after his death.

== Life ==
Born in Copenhagen, Rued Langgaard was the only son of composer and Royal Chamber musician Siegfried Langgaard and Emma Langgaard (née Foss), both of whom were pianists. At the age of five Rued began taking piano lessons with his mother, and later with his father and a private teacher. His talent emerged quickly, and at seven he was able to play Schumann's Davidsbündlertänze and Chopin's mazurkas. By then he had begun to compose short pieces for the piano and play the organ. At 10 he began to study the organ under Gustav Helsted, organist at the Jesuskirken in Valby, and the violin under Chr. Petersen, formerly of the Royal Orchestra.

At the age of 11 he made his first public appearance as an organist and improviser on the organ at a concert at the Frederikskirken (Marmorkirken) in Copenhagen. When he was 12, he started to study music theory under C. F. E. Horneman and, later, Vilhelm Rosenberg.

Langgaard's first compositions, 2 piano pieces and 2 songs, were published when he was 13, and around that time he was taught counterpoint by the celebrated composer Carl Nielsen for about a month. A year later, his choral work Musae triumphantes was performed at a concert in Copenhagen, marking his public debut as a composer. During his teen years he continued composing and travelled with his parents around Christmas and New Year's Eve, meeting conductors Arthur Nikisch and Max Fiedler.

At 18, Langgaard served as assistant organist at the Frederikskirken (Marmorkirken) in Copenhagen. The following year (1913) his Symphony No. 1 "Mountain Pastorals" received its first performance at a concert in Berlin with the Berlin Philharmonic under the baton of Max Fiedler.

His father died in 1914, and from 1915 to 1917 he was assistant organist at the Garnisons Kirke in Copenhagen. From 1917 onward he applied without success for the post of organist at a large number of churches in Copenhagen. In 1922 a young woman named Valborg Constance Olivia Tetens (she was known as Constance) moved in with Rued Langgaard and his mother in Copenhagen. A year after his mother died in 1926, Langgaard married Constance Tetens.

Although Langgaard was given a state grant from the age of 30, his works and job applications were almost continually rejected by the establishment. Only at the age of 46 did he manage to obtain a permanent job, as the organist at the cathedral in Ribe, the oldest town in Denmark, situated in southwest Jutland. Just shy of his 59th birthday, Rued Langgaard died in Ribe, still unrecognized as a composer.

== Music ==
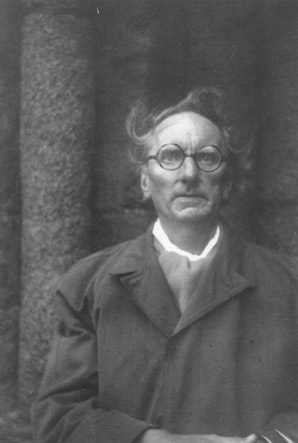
Langgaard in later life

Rued Langgaard composed in a late Romantic style, emphatically dramatic and endowed with colossal mood swings. Unquestionably, he was influenced by Richard Wagner and Richard Strauss and, like Strauss, he was a master of orchestration. He was a prolific composer for the large orchestra, writing 16 symphonies as well as other orchestral works.

Music of the Spheres is his best-known and most radical work. It is a symphonic work of great complexity, calling for a large orchestra including organ and a piano on which the strings are played directly rather than via the keys, choir, and a supporting (distant) orchestra including a soprano voice. It was composed during World War I, but only performed twice (in Germany in 1921–1922) during Langgaard's lifetime and lay dormant for almost 50 years before being rediscovered. When it was rediscovered in the late 1960s, it was considered remarkably modern and reflective of the pathfinding style in which Langgaard composed. In 2010 Music of the Spheres received its British premiere at The Proms, conducted by Thomas Dausgaard.

His unorthodox style and sense of drama extended to the titles of his compositions. His fourth and sixth symphonies are known as the Leaf Fall and Heaven Storming. His symphonies Nos. 13 and 16 are named Faithlessness and Deluge of Sun, respectively. Examples of descriptive names for individual movements are Wireless Caruso and Compulsive Energy and Daddies rushing off to the Office (in symphony No. 14, The Morning).

His total production of over 400 works included more than 150 songs, works for piano, organ, and an opera entitled Antikrist (The Antichrist).

== Selected works ==
BVN refers to the numbering of works in: Bendt Viinholt Nielsen: Rued Langgaards Kompositioner (Rued Langgaard's Compositions. An Annotated Catalogue of Works. With an English Introduction). Odense University Press, 1991.

=== Opera ===
- Antikrist (Antichrist), "church opera" in two acts (or a prologue and six scenes) for soloists, mixed choir, and orchestra

- Original version: BVN 170; 1921–1923
- Revised version: BVN 192; 1926–1930

=== Symphonies ===
- Symphony No. 1, Klippepastoraler (Cliffside Pastorals) (BVN 32; 1908–1909, rev. 1910–1911)
- The Second Symphony exists in two versions:

- Symphony No. 2, (BVN 53; 1912 1914)
- Symphony No. 2, Vårbrud (Awakening of Spring) (BVN 53; 1912 1914, rev. 1926–1933)

- Symphony No. 3, Ungdomsbrus (La Melodia) (The Flush of Youth (La Melodia)), for piano and orchestra (BVN 96; 1915–1916, rev. 1925–1933)
- Symphony No. 4, Løvfald (Leaf-fall) (BVN 124; 1916, rev. 1920)
- The Fifth Symphony exists in two versions:

- Symphony No. 5 (BVN 191; 1917–1918, rev. 1919–1920 and 1926)
- Symphony No. 5, Steppenatur (Sommersagnsdrama) (Steppe Landscape (Summer Legend Drama)) (BVN 216; rev. 1931)

- Symphony No. 6 "Det Himmelrivende" (The Stormy Sky) (1919-20/1928-30), BVN. 165
- The Seventh Symphony exists in two versions:

- Symphony No. 7 (1st version, 1925–26), BVN. 188
- Symphony No. 7 "Ved Tordenskjold i Holmens Kirke" (By Tordenskjold in Holmen Church (2nd version, 1925-26/1930-32), BVN. 212

- Symphony No. 8 "Minder ved Amalienborg" (Memories at Amalienborg) (with mixed chorus, 1926–28/1929-1934), BVN. 193
- Symphony No. 9 "Fra Dronning Dagmars By" (From Queen Dagmar's City) (1942), BVN. 282
- Symphony No. 10 "Hin Tordenbolig" (Yon Hall of Thunder) (1944–45), BVN. 298
- Symphony No. 11 "Ixion" (1944–45), BVN. 303
- Symphony No. 12 "Helsingeborg" (1946), BVN. 318
- Symphony No. 13 "Undertro" (Belief in Wonders) (1946–47), BVN. 319
- Symphony No. 14 (Suite) "Morgenen" (Morning) (with mixed chorus, 1947-48/1951), BVN. 336
- Symphony No. 15 "Søstormen" (Storm at Sea) (with bass-baritone solo and male chorus, 1937/1949), BVN. 375
- Symphony No. 16 "Syndflod af Sol" (Deluge of the Sun) (1951), BVN. 417

=== Other orchestral works ===
- Drapa (On the Death of Edvard Grieg, 1907–09), BVN. 20
- Heltedød (Death of a Hero) (1907–08), BVN. 24
- Sphinx (Tone Poem) (1907–13), BVN. 37
- Saga blot (A Thing of the Past) (1917–19), BVN. 140
- Symfonisk Festspil (Symphonic Festival Play) (1917–20), BVN. 166
- Prelude to "Antikrist" (original version, 1921–23), BVN. 170:1
- Music for "En Digters Drøm" (A Poet's Dream) (1923–26), BVN. 181
- Musernes Dans paa Helikon (The Dance of the Muses on Helicon) (Concert Ouverture, 1925/1939), BVN. 185
- Prelude to "Fortabelsen (Antikrist)" (Perdition (Antikrist)) (1921-23/1926-30), BVN. 192:1
- Prelude to "Komedien om Enhver" (Comedy of an Everyman) (1921-23/1936), BVN. 232
- The Danish National Radio (Fanfares, 1948), BVN. 351
- Mistèrio "Dødssejleren" (The Phantom Ship) after Liszt (1931–32)

=== Concertante works ===
- Concerto (in one movement) for Violin and Orchestra (1943–44), BVN. 289
- Interdikt for Organ and Orchestra (1947–48), BVN. 335
- Søndagssonate (Sunday Sonata) for Violin, piano, organ and orchestra (1949–50), BVN. 393
- "Fra Arild" (From Arild), concerto for piano and orchestra freely adapted from compositions by Siegfried Langgaard (1935–37)

=== Voice and orchestra ===
- Drømmen (The Dream) (Sinfonia interna) (1915-16/1945), BVN. 98
- Hav og Sol (Sea and Sun) (with soprano or mezzo-soprano; version with chorus by Mike Cholewa after the composer's sketches, 1915/1940s), BVN. 102
- Music of the Spheres (Sfærernes musik), for soprano, mixed choir, organ, orchestra, and "distant orchestra" (BVN 128; 1916–1918)
- Out of the Depths (Fra dybet), for mixed choir and orchestra (BVN 414; 1950, rev. 1952)

=== Chamber music ===
- String Quartet No. 1 (BVN 68; 1914–1915, rev. 1936)
- String Quartet No. 2 (BVN 145; 1918; rev. 1931)
- String Quartet No. 3 (BVN 183; 1924)
- String Quartet No. 4, Summer Days (Sommerdage) (BVN 215; 1914–1918, rev. 1931)
- String Quartet in A-flat major (BVN 155; 1918)
- String Quartet No. 6 (BVN 160; 1918–1919)
- String Quartet No. 5 (BVN 189; 1925, rev. 1926–1938)
- Violin Sonata No. 1, "Viole" (1915/1945), BVN 94
- Violin Sonata No. 2, "Den store Mester kommer" (Behold the Master Cometh) (1920–21), BVN 167
- Violin Sonata No. 3 (1945–49), BVN 312
- Violin Sonata No. 4, "Parce nobis, Jesu!" (1949), BVN 376
- Septet, for winds (BVN 95; 1915)
- Humoreske, sextet for winds and drum (BVN 176; 1922–1923)

== Recordings ==
In recent years, many of his works have been recorded, including recordings by Danacord of his complete symphonies on seven CDs. This cycle, with the Artur Rubinstein Philharmonic Orchestra conducted by Ilya Stupel, was followed by a second cycle recorded by Dacapo with the Danish National Symphony Orchestra under the baton of Thomas Dausgaard. Both cycles have had their share of critical recognition.

Other works of Langgaard currently available on CD include Music of the Spheres, Messis (Organ drama in three evenings), Antichrist (Church opera in six scenes), Duo Lys Pa Himlen, piano concertos, The End of Time, and various works for solo instruments. Some secular and religious choral works, performed by Ars Nova Copenhagen, can be found the CD Rose Garden Songs.
