= Anna Kraus (opera) =

Radio opera by Franz Reizenstein

Anna Kraus, Op. 30, is a radio opera in one act by composer Franz Reizenstein. The work uses an English language libretto by Christopher Hassall to tell the tragic tale of a German woman who is forced to leave her country due to oppression from the Nazi regime, as the Nazis did not like her political views.

The opera was commissioned by the British Broadcasting Corporation following the popular success of Reizenstein's 1951 cantata Voices of Night. The opera premiered on 25 July 1952 on BBC Third Programme with conductor Norman Del Mar leading the BBC Symphony Orchestra and singers Victoria Sladen (as Anna) and Lloyd Strauss-Smith (as Pavel). It was submitted by the BBC later that year for the Prix Italia. Critical reaction to the work was mixed. The New Statesman described the work as "engaging" and a "worthwhile experiment". The Annual Register wrote that the opera "suffered from the composer's emotion being too closely engaged in the sufferings of the heroine, a refugee from political oppression".
