= Norman Del Mar =

British conductor, horn player, and biographer (1919–1994)

- Born: 31 July 1919; Hampstead, England
- Died: 6 February 1994 (aged 74); Bushey, Hertfordshire, England
- Occupations: Conductor; Horn player; Biographer; Academic teacher

Norman René Del Mar CBE (31 July 1919 – 6 February 1994) was an English conductor, horn player, and biographer. As a conductor, he specialised in the music of late romantic composers; including Edward Elgar, Gustav Mahler, and Richard Strauss. He left a great legacy of recordings of British music, in particular Elgar, Ralph Vaughan Williams, Frederick Delius, and Benjamin Britten. He notably conducted the premiere recording of Britten's children's opera Noye's Fludde.

== Life and career ==
Born in Hampstead, London, Del Mar began his career as a horn player. He was one of the original members of the Royal Philharmonic Orchestra (RPO), which was established by Sir Thomas Beecham in 1946. Within the first few months of the RPO's existence, Beecham appointed Del Mar as his assistant conductor. Del Mar made his professional debut as a conductor with the RPO in 1947.

In 1949 Del Mar was appointed principal conductor of the English Opera Group, in which post he remained until 1954. In 1952 he conducted the BBC Symphony Orchestra in the world premiere of Franz Reizenstein's radio opera Anna Kraus. He then held chief conducting posts with the Yorkshire Symphony Orchestra (1954) the BBC Scottish Symphony Orchestra (1960–1965), and the Aarhus Symphony Orchestra (1985–1988). A regular at the BBC Proms concerts, he conducted the famous Last Night on three occasions: 1973, 1975, and 1983. He was also 'permanent guest conductor' with the Göteborg Symphony Orchestra from 1969–1973.

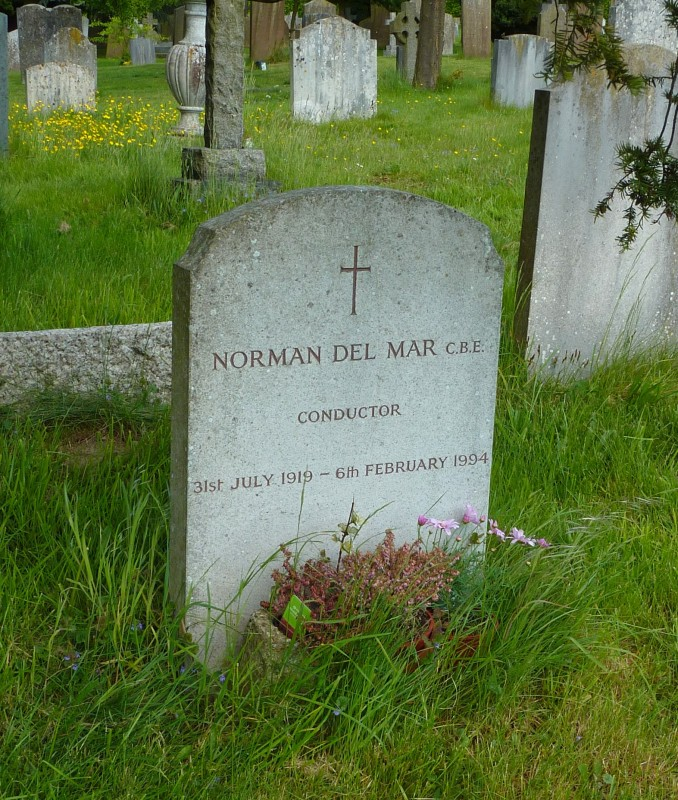
Norman Del Mar's grave at St Peter's Church in Limpsfield, Surrey, photographed in 2013

In 1953 Del Mar joined the faculty of the Guildhall School of Music and Drama where he conducted the school's orchestra and taught conducting until 1960. In 1972 he began to teach conducting at the Royal College of Music, serving until 1990. He also conducted the Royal Academy of Music's orchestra from 1974–1977.

In 1976 he conducted the world premiere of Thomas Wilson's opera The Confessions of a Justified Sinner, based on the novel of that title by James Hogg. The cast was led by Philip Langridge, Thomas Hemsley, and John Shirley-Quirk.

He was an authority on Richard Strauss and wrote a three-volume work on Strauss's life and music. In addition, his books include the following titles:

- Anatomy of the Orchestra (ISBN 0520045009)
- Conducting Beethoven (ISBN 0198162189, Volume 1; ISBN 0-19-816359-2, Volume 2)
- Conducting Berlioz (ISBN 0198165528)
- Conducting Brahms (ISBN 0198163584)
- Conducting Elgar (ISBN 0198165579, compiled and edited by his son Jonathan Del Mar)
- Conducting Favourite Concert Pieces (ISBN 0198165587)
- Mahler's sixth symphony: a study (ISBN 090387329X)
- Orchestral variations: confusion and error in the orchestral repertoire (ISBN 0903873370)

As well as making approximately 70 recordings of his own, Del Mar was a lifelong record collector, and his extensive collection of rare 78s is held by the University of Southampton.

He died in 1994, aged 74. He had two sons. The elder is the Beethoven editor Jonathan Del Mar, and the younger is Robin Del Mar who is a viola player.

Cultural offices
Preceded by Ian Whyte	Principal Conductor, BBC Scottish Symphony Orchestra; 1960-1965	Succeeded by James Loughran
Preceded by Ole Schmidt	Principal Conductor, Aarhus Symphony Orchestra; 1985-1988	Succeeded by Eri Klas
