= Jonathan Del Mar =

British music editor and conductor

Jonathan Del Mar (born 7 January 1951) is a British music editor and conductor.

== Biography ==
Jonathan Del Mar was born in London in 1951; his father was conductor Norman Del Mar. He studied at Christ Church, Oxford and the Royal College of Music in London.

== Beethoven scholar ==
He is most noted for his intense research of Beethoven's works, particularly the new edition of Beethoven's nine symphonies for Bärenreiter. This edition has been used by conductors of the standing of Claudio Abbado, Bernard Haitink, Sir Simon Rattle, Philippe Herreweghe, Osmo Vänskä and David Zinman and orchestras such as the Hanover Band, Minnesota Orchestra, and the Orchestre Révolutionnaire et Romantique.

His research on Beethoven's symphonies started in 1984. In December 1996 the score for the Ninth Symphony was published, attracting attention from the press. There were four recordings of the symphony prior to the publication of the new edition, with the conductors using the Breitkopf edition with the corrections as they were available to them; Roy Goodman was the first conductor using corrections by Del Mar, followed by Sir Charles Mackerras in 1991, Sir John Eliot Gardiner in 1992, and Claudio Abbado in 1996.

The publication of the new editions of Beethoven's symphonies was concluded in 2000 with the Seventh Symphony. Other works he studied that resulted in new scores being published were the cello sonatas (2004), string quartets up to Op. 95 (2006-8), the Violin Concerto, as well as the Dvorak Cello Concerto. He is currently working on the 5 Beethoven Piano Concertos.

== Conducting ==
He was resident conductor of Cumbria Youth Orchestra from 1980 until 1996.
