= William Mann (critic) =

English music critic

William Somervell Mann (14 February 1924 – 5 September 1989) was an English music critic. Born in India, he was educated at Winchester and Cambridge, studying music with several prominent composers, before taking up a career as a critic.

For most of his career he was on the staff of The Times in London, where his radical views were in contrast with the paper's traditional outlook. He published many books and articles in musical journals.

After leaving The Times Mann was director of the Bath Festival for a year.

== Life and career ==
Mann was born in Madras, India, the son of Gerald and Joyce Mann. He was educated at the Dragon School and Winchester, after which he took lessons in London, studying the piano with Ilona Kabos and composition with Mátyás Seiber. He was at Magdalene College, Cambridge from 1946 to 1948, studying with the composers Patrick Hadley and Robin Orr and the organist Hubert Middleton.

On leaving Cambridge in 1948 Mann joined The Times in London. In the same year he married Erika Charlotte Emilie Sohler, with whom he had four daughters. He remained at The Times for 34 years, first as assistant music critic (1948–1960) and then as chief music critic (1960–1982). Although the paper in the post-war decades was generally conservative and traditional, Mann was, as a colleague described him, "markedly progressive, even iconoclastic, in outlook." In 1958 Mann contributed the libretto to Franz Reizenstein's Let's Fake an Opera, produced for the 1958 Hoffnung Music Festival. It consisted of "ridiculously juxtaposed excerpts from more than forty operas, which delighted both Reizenstein and the audience".

Mann was one of the first music critics to see serious artistic value in rock music. He achieved some notoriety for his assertion that the Beatles were "the greatest songwriters since Schubert". Most unusually for a serious music critic, he appeared as a panellist on the television pop music programme "Juke Box Jury". As a broadcaster, however, he was better known as a regular contributor to the BBC Third Programme (later BBC Radio 3). He contributed reviews to The Gramophone for many years.

In 1985 Mann was director of the Bath Festival in succession to William Glock.

Mann died in Bath at the age of 65.

== Publications ==
- Hermann Scherchen: The Nature of Music (Mann's translation of Vom Wesen der Musik), 1950
- Introduction to the Music of J. S. Bach, 1950
- Benjamin Britten (contributor to symposium), 1952
- The Concerto (contributor), 1952
- The Record Guide (contributor), 1955
- Chamber Music, 1957
- The Analytical Concert Guide (editor), 1957
- Music and Western Man (contributor), 1958
- Let's Fake an Opera (with Franz Reizenstein), 1958
- Richard Strauss: A Critical Study of the Operas, 1964
- Wagner's The Ring' Introduction and Translation, 1964
- Michael Tippett (contributor), 1965
- Wagner's Tristan, Introduction and Translation, 1968
- The Operas of Mozart, 1977
- Opera on Record (contributor), vol. 1 1979, vol. 2 1983, vol. 3 1984
- Music in Time, 1982
- The Book of the Violin (contributor), 1984

Articles:

- "Feuersnot: a more positive view of Strauss", The Listener, 10 September 1964, p. 406
