= Kenneth Woollam =

English opera singer (1937–2020)

Kenneth Woollam (16 January 1937 – 15 April 2020) was an English operatic tenor. He was principal tenor at English National Opera for twelve years.

== Life ==
Woollam was born in Chester in 1937. At Chester Cathedral Choir School he was head chorister, and he went on to study at the Royal College of Music with Heddle Nash. He was in the chorus of Glyndebourne Festival Opera from 1962 to 1964, and was a member of the BBC Singers from 1964 to 1972.

In 1972 he joined Sadler's Wells Opera (later renamed English National Opera): his debut was as Pierre in the British stage premiere of Prokofiev's War and Peace. He was principal tenor with the company from 1974 until the mid 1980s. Roles included Florestan in Beethoven's Fidelio, the title roles in Wagner's Rienzi and Siegfried, Siegmund in Die Walküre, Calaf in Puccini's Turandot, and Herod in Strauss's Salome. He appeared in a series of operas of Leoš Janáček conducted by Charles Mackerras.

He also appeared occasionally with other opera companies, including Scottish Opera and Opera North.

Woollam created roles in new operas: The Royal Hunt of the Sun by Iain Hamilton, Toussaint by David Blake, and A Gentle Spirit by John Tavener.

He made concert appearances which continued after retiring from stage work. In 1985 he became Professor of Singing at the Royal College of Music. In later years he also coached actors, including Lenny Henry, Glenn Close and Niels Arestrup.

He married Phoebe in 1965; the couple had four daughters. Woollam died in 2020, aged 83.
