= Antikrist =

Opera by Rued Langgaard

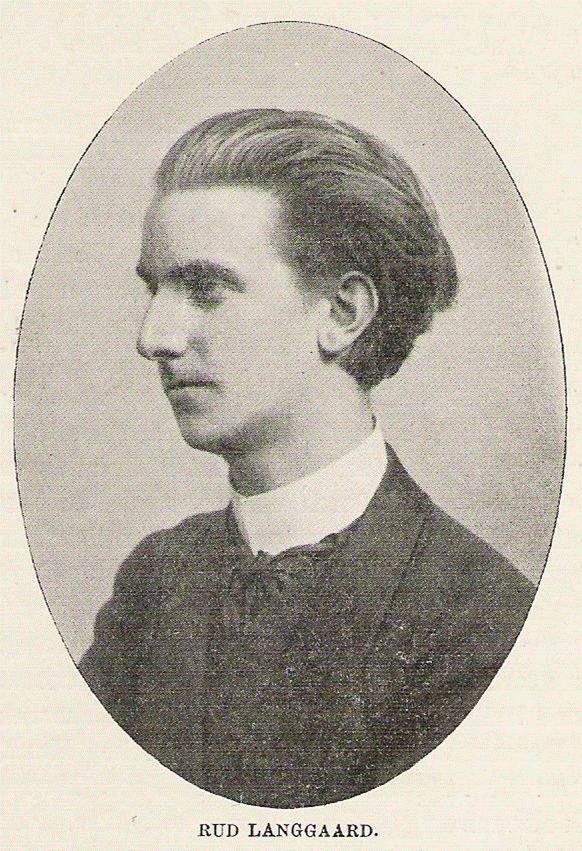
Rued Langgaard in 1917

Antikrist (English: Antichrist) is the only opera by Danish composer Rued Langgaard. It was composed in 1921–23 and reworked in 1926–30, but despite several attempts by the composer to have it performed, the work was not premiered until many years after Langgaard's death. Today, it is considered Langgaard's principal work and is included in the Danish Culture Canon; it was the first Danish opera recorded on DVD in 2002.

== Background ==
The first version of Antikrist was completed in 1923 and submitted to the Royal Danish Theatre that year. It was rejected then and several times later because of censorship problems.

In 1926 the composer began a complete rewrite of the work. The text, which had been the overriding reason for the rejection, was radically rewritten. The new version was completed in 1930, after which Langgaard again tried to get it accepted at the Royal Theatre. It didn't help; it was rejected and was turned back again in 1935, again with the text as the primary criticism.

Langgaard was slightly more successful in getting the work accepted by the Danish Broadcasting Corporation, where the conductor Launy Grøndahl worked on the opera in 1940. The work however was not performed until 1980 by the Danish National Symphony Orchestra under Michael Schønwandt. The first recording was made in 1988 by Ole Schmidt and the Copenhagen Philharmonic.

== Plot ==
The opera has a non-traditional plot structure split between two acts, with three scenes in each act. The subject of the opera is the biblical figure of the Antichrist, and the consequences of the Antichrist's activities on Earth. It begins with the Antichrist being sent into the world and ends with the Antichrist's final destruction. In between these two structural points, each scene illustrates an aspect of the Antichrist in the world.

=== Act 1 ===
The prologue starts with Lucifer, sung by a baritone, raising the Antichrist out of the pit and God, who is represented by a speaking voice, allowing the Antichrist to act on the Earth for a period of time.

Scene 1, titled The Light of the Wilderness, features a soprano singing the part of the Spirit of Mystery and a mezzo-soprano sing the spirit's echo. The scene focuses on the apathetic state of the world and looks forward to the dawning of a new age of hope.

Vainglory, the title of Scene 2, is primarily focused on a tenor playing the Mouth Speaking Great Things and espouses a populist slogan characterized by faith in the progression of society.

In Scene 3, Despair, Despondency (Despair), sung by a mezzo-soprano, sings of pessimism and cynicism that functions as humankind's cross under the age of the Antichrist.

=== Act 2 ===
The second act starts with Lust, which features a soprano as the Great Whore (Babel), a tenor playing the Scarlet-Coloured Beast, and a mixed choir representing humanity. The two figures elaborate on egocentric hedonism worshiped by humankind.

The Great Whore and the same tenor who played the Scarlet-Coloured Beast, now playing the Lie, feature in Scene 5 Every Man Against His Neighbour along with a bass representing Hate, accompanied by a mixed choir representing demons. The Lie and the Great Whore argue over truth and power, while Hate intervenes in their squabble, while the world begins to perish.

The final scene Perdition features a Mystical Voice, sung by a mezzo-soprano, who curses the Antichrist, while God destroys the Antichrist. This is followed by the Ephphatha Chorus, sung by the choir, where God gives peace harmony and insight to creation.

== Recordings ==
Antikrist was premiered as a scenic opera in 1999 at the Tiroler Landestheater Innsbruck, on the initiative of the Danish conductor Niels Muus. Three years later the opera was premiered in Denmark in a collaboration between DR and the Royal Theatre. The performance that took place in the Riding School at Christiansborg in 2002 was released on DVD in 2005. In September 2015, Antikrist was performed at the annual Langgaard Festival in Ribe.
