= Thomas Dausgaard =

Danish conductor

Thomas Dausgaard (Danish: [ˈtsʰʌmæs ˈtɑwˀsˌkɒˀ]; born 4 July 1963 in Copenhagen) is a Danish conductor.

== Biography ==
Dausgaard studied conducting at the Royal Academy of Music in Copenhagen and with Norman Del Mar at the Royal College of Music in London. He subsequently participated in conducting masterclasses with Franco Ferrara, Leonard Bernstein and Hiroyuki Iwaki.

In Scandinavia, Dausgaard became chief conductor of the Swedish Chamber Orchestra from 1997. From 2001 to 2004, he was Principal Guest Conductor of the Danish National Symphony Orchestra (DNSO), and became Chief Conductor in 2004, the first Danish conductor to hold the post. He concluded his principal conductorship of the DNSO at the close of the 2010–2011 season, and subsequently became the orchestra's æresdirigent (honorary conductor). Dausgaard concluded his tenure as chief conductor of the Swedish Chamber Orchestra at the close of the 2018–2019 season, and subsequently took the title of conductor laureate with the orchestra.

Dausgaard first guest-conducted the Seattle Symphony in March 2003. In 2013, the orchestra named him as its next principal guest conductor, effective with the 2014–2015 season, with an initial contract of 3 years, later extended for another three years to the 2019–2020 season. He became the symphony's music director in the 2019–2020 season, with a 4 season contract. However, on 3 January 2022, Dausgaard resigned from the Seattle Symphony via e-mail, with immediate effect, citing a hostile work environment with the Seattle Symphony organisation.

In March 2015, the BBC Scottish Symphony Orchestra (BBC SSO) announced the appointment of Dausgaard as its next Chief Conductor, effective with the 2016–2017 season. In January 2018, the BBC SSO announced the extension of Dausgaard's contract as Chief Conductor through the 2021–2022 season. Dausgaard concluded his tenure as chief conductor of the BBC SSO at the close of the 2021–2022 season.

In March 2024, the RTVE Symphony Orchestra announced the appointment of Dausgaard as its next principal guest conductor, effective with the 2024–2025 season. In April 2024, the Copenhagen Philharmonic announced the appointment of Dausgaard as its new æres-gæstedirigent (honorary guest conductor), effective with the 2024–2025 season, with an initial contract of four seasons. Dausgaard first guest-conducted the Nagoya Philharmonic Orchestra in October 2025. In October 2026, the Nagoya Philharmonic announced the appointment of Dausgaard as its next principal guest conductor, effective April 2027.

== Recordings ==
Dausgaard has been a regular conductor of the music of Per Nørgård, and is the dedicatee of Nørgård's composition Terrains Vagues. With the DNSO, he has recorded extensively for Chandos, EMI, Virgin and DaCapo labels, including Danish and other Scandinavian music, like works by Per Nørgård, symphony cycles of Johan Svendsen, Johan Peter Emilius Hartmann, Rued Langgaard, Dag Wirén, Franz Berwald, works by August Enna and Asger Hamerik, as well as by Carl Nielsen. With the Swedish Chamber Orchestra Dausgaard has recorded the complete orchestral works by Ludwig van Beethoven for Simax, and for BIS they have recorded works by Pyotr Ilyich Tchaikovsky, Richard Wagner, Anton Bruckner, Antonín Dvořák, Felix Mendelssohn, Johann Sebastian Bach, Mark-Anthony Turnage, Steve Mackey, Anders Hillborg, Olga Neuwirth, Uri Caine, Brett Dean, as well as complete symphony cycles of Robert Schumann, Franz Schubert and Johannes Brahms, including Dausgaard's own orchestrations of 18 Hungarian Dances by Brahms. For the Seattle Symphony Media Label, Dausgaard has recorded symphonies by Carl Nielsen and Gustav Mahler as well as works by George Walker, Richard Strauss, Alexander Scriabin and Rued Langgaard of which several have been nominated for a Grammy.

== Personal life ==
Dausgaard has four children; three sons from his previous marriage to Helle Hentzer, and a daughter with his second wife, Alissa Rossius Dausgaard. Dausgaard has been awarded the Cross of Chivalry by the Queen of Denmark, and elected to the Royal Swedish Academy of Music. In March 2025, Dausgaard published his first collection of poems "Flaskepost" (Wanderblume publishing house).

Cultural offices
Preceded by (no predecessor)	Principal Conductor, Swedish Chamber Orchestra; 1997–2019	Succeeded by Martin Fröst
Preceded by Gerd Albrecht	Principal Conductor, Danish National Symphony Orchestra; 2004–2011	Succeeded by Rafael Frühbeck de Burgos
Preceded by Donald Runnicles	Chief Conductor, BBC Scottish Symphony Orchestra; 2016–2022	Succeeded by Ryan Wigglesworth
