= Franz Reizenstein =

British composer (1911–1968)

Franz Reizenstein

Franz Theodor Reizenstein (7 June 1911 – 15 October 1968) was a German-born British composer and concert pianist. He left Germany for sanctuary in Britain in 1934 and went on to have his teaching and performing career there. As a composer, he successfully blended the equally strong but very different influences of his primary teachers, Hindemith and Vaughan Williams.

== Life ==
Franz Reizenstein's parents were the well-known physician Dr. Albert Reizenstein (1871–1925) and his wife Lina Kohn (born 1880), both of Nuremberg, Germany. The family was Jewish and counted many professionals, scientists, bankers, and musically inclined people among its members.

Reizenstein grew up in Nuremberg and was considered a child prodigy. He composed his first pieces when he was 5, and by the age of 17 he had written a string quartet. His well-to-do and artistic family encouraged him to play chamber music at home. Eventually he was sent to study composition under Paul Hindemith and piano under Leonid Kreutzer at the Berliner Hochschule für Musik. Hindemith's composition class also included Harald Genzmer, Oskar Sala and Arnold Cooke. Reizenstein remained a lifelong friend of Cooke and kept his Piano Concerto (1940) in his repertoire. He was awarded the Bechstein Prize for piano playing in 1932, graduating a year later.

In 1934 he emigrated to England at the age of 23 to escape the Nazis, one of the first of nearly 70 émigré musicians from Nazi Europe to do so between 1933 and 1945. Once in England, he furthered his studies under Ralph Vaughan Williams for composition and Constant Lambert for conducting at the Royal College of Music, and began to incorporate English musical influences into his works. He also studied the piano for eleven years with Solomon Cutner, and took a course of conducting under Felix Weingartner in Basel.

During the 1930s Reizenstein performed as a pianist, making his first public appearance in the UK in April 1935 at the Grotrian Hall. He was the first to perform Hindemith's three piano sonatas of 1936 in the UK, on Wednesday 1 June 1938 at the Wigmore Hall. He also played with the violinist Carl Flesch. With the violinist Maria Lidka and the cellist Christopher Bunting he formed the Reizenstein Trio, and he also performed with two émigré violinists, Max Rostal and Erich Gruenberg.

Reizenstein published his first piece, the Suite for Piano, Op. 6, in 1936. He gained more attention with the "virtuosic and flamboyant" Prologue, Variations and Finale, Op. 12, composed two years later for Max Rostal. Its South American rhythms (in the finale) were inspired by an extended tour which he took to Chile and Argentina in 1937, undertaken with another legendary violinist, Roman Totenberg.

At the start of World War II, Reizenstein, as a German, was interned in Central Camp in Douglas, Isle of Man. He continued to compose while within the camp although he was soon released, along with the other internees who did not pose a threat to the British. Unfit for active service, he worked as a train conductor during the war, while continuing his composition and performance work. He married his wife Margaret Lawson, an English music critic, in 1942, and they had a son, John Reizenstein. They lived at 34, Hollycroft Avenue, London NW3. That year he gave the first public performance of his Piano Concerto No 1 with the London Philharmonic Orchestra, conducted by Sir Adrian Boult.

In 1958 he became a professor (of piano, not composition) at the Royal Academy of Music and (in 1964) the Royal Manchester College of Music. Amongst his pupils at the academy were Peter Cowderoy, Lyndon Davies, Eric Hope, Benjamin Kaplan, Philip Martin (whom he taught piano and also composition), Jeffrey Siegel and David Wilde. His academic credentials in composition were finally officially recognised when in 1966 he was appointed visiting professor of composition at Boston University for six months, where there were also special concerts given of his works.

Through his mother's Kohn family, Reizenstein was related to the writer Catherine Yronwode.

== Music ==
Like fellow émigré composer Hans Gál, Reizenstein rejected the serial procedures followed by many of his contemporaries and adopted a tonal, expressive style influenced by Vaughan Williams and the English lyrical tradition, tempered with the objectivity and contrapuntal complexity of Hindemith.

Hugo Cole divided his work into three periods: the first (1936–1945) emphasising motivic development, rhythmic energy and fugal counterpoint; the second (1947–1959) introducing more elegiac and expressive material; and the third (1960–1968) a late style more genial and relaxed, with freer thematic development and transformation. In the first period are the early Piano Concerto and Piano Sonata No 1. In the second are the Scherzo, Op. 21, the Piano Quintet, the 12 Preludes and Fugues and the Second Piano Concerto. The late period includes the three solo string sonatas, the Elizabeth Browning Sonnets and his final work, the Concerto for String Orchestra, which received its premiere a year after his death.

He composed a number of orchestral works including overtures (such as Cyrano de Bergerac, performed at the BBC Proms on 30 August 1957) and concertos (such as the two Piano Concertos, the late Concerto for String Orchestra, a Violin Concerto and a Cello Concerto). A symphony remained unfinished at his death.

The chamber and piano works are particularly highly regarded, the best known of these is the Piano Quintet in D major, Op. 23 (1949) of which the critic Lionel Salter wrote in Gramophone in July 1975: It "stands alongside Shostakovich's as the most noteworthy of this century's piano quintets." The Violin Sonata (1945) was dedicated to Maria Lidka, who performed it at the premiere in January 1946. That was followed by the Viola Sonata (1946), written for Watson Forbes, who performed it the same year in Cambridge. The 12 Preludes and Fugues, heavily influenced by Hindemith's Ludus Tonalis, display Reizenstein's personal harmonic idiom (heavy with 4ths and semitones) and feature pairs of preludes and fugues that are closely related thematically.

The cantata Voices of Night (1950–51) represented, according to John Weissmann, "the complete maturity of [his] recently assimilated musical idiom...this cantata places him at a single stroke in the English choral tradition". He also wrote two operas, Men Against the Sea (1949) and Anna Kraus (1952), and composed lavish orchestral scores for the Hammer horror film The Mummy (1959) and the cult British horror film Circus of Horrors (1960).

Commercially available recordings include the piano music played by Martin Jones (Lyrita SRCD.2342, 2014), the Piano Concerto No 2 and Serenade in F with Oliver Triendl and the Nürnberger Symphoniker (CPO 555245-2, 2019), the Cello Concerto, played by Raphael Wallfisch, and the Violin Sonata, op 20, played by Louisa Stonehill and Nicholas Burns (Lyrita SRCD.360, 2017). He recorded some of his own works, including the Piano Sonata, for the Lyrita record label in 1958.

=== Hoffnung Festivals ===
Reizenstein contributed the Concerto Popolare ("A piano concerto to end all piano concertos") to Gerard Hoffnung's first music festival in 1956. Hoffnung's festivals were comedy events, trading on the musical knowledge of the audience. The premise of the Concerto Popolare is that the orchestra believes it is playing Tchaikovsky's First Piano Concerto, but the pianist believes he or she is playing the Grieg Piano Concerto. A pitched musical battle ensues, dragging in other themes (notably from Rhapsody in Blue, the Warsaw Concerto and the song "Roll Out the Barrel"). The soloist at the premiere was Yvonne Arnaud (otherwise a renowned actress), who had been chosen after Hoffnung's first choice, Eileen Joyce, declined.

At the 1958 Hoffnung Festival he contributed (with William Mann) Let's Fake an Opera or The Tales of Hoffnung Mann's libretto consisted of "ridiculously juxtaposed excerpts from more than forty operas, which delighted both Reizenstein and the audience". Daniel Snowman called it "an insane collage of opera plots and themes".

Also popular was his set of Variations on The Lambeth Walk (a popular song of the 1930s), for solo piano, each variation being a parody of the style of a major classical composer. The composers parodied are Chopin, Verdi, Beethoven, Mozart, Schubert, Wagner and Liszt.

== Selected works ==
=== Orchestral and Concertante ===
- 1934 – Allegro Sinfonica for orchestra
- 1936 – Cello Concerto (revised 1948, premiere 1951)
- 1938 – Capriccio for orchestra
- 1940 – Ballet Suite
- 1941 – Piano Concerto No.1 in G major
- 1951 – Cyrano de Bergerac, overture
- 1951 – A Jolly Overture for orchestra
- 1953 – Serenade in F major for small orchestra
- 1953 – Violin Concerto in G major, Op. 31
- 1954 – Prologue, Variations and Finale for violin and orchestra
- 1956 – Concerto Popolare
- 1961 – Piano Concerto No.2 in F major
- 1967 – Concerto for String Orchestra

=== Choral and Operatic ===
- 1949 – Men Against the Sea, opera
- 1950 – Voices of Night, cantata
- 1952 – Anna Kraus, opera
- 1958 – Genesis, oratorio
- 1959 – Five Sonnets of Elizabeth Barrett Browning

=== Chamber ===
- 1931 – Theme, Variations & Fugue for clarinet & string quartet (rev. 1960)
- 1931 – Cello Sonata
- 1933 – Wind Quintet
- 1938 – Divertimento for brass quartet
- 1939 – Divertimento for string quartet
- 1949 – Piano Quintet
- 1949 – Trio in A major for flute, oboe & piano
- 1951 – Serenade in F major for wind
- 1957 – Piano Trio in One Movement
- 1963 – Trio for flute, clarinet & bassoon

=== Instrumental ===
- 1932 – Variations for flute and piano
- 1936 – Three Pieces for violin and piano
- 1937 – Three Concert Pieces for oboe and piano
- 1937 – Elegy for cello and piano
- 1938 – Prologue, Variations and Finale for violin and piano
- 1938 – Sonatina for oboe & piano
- 1938 – Three Concert Pieces for oboe and piano
- 1939 – Partita for flute (or treble recorder) and piano
- 1942 – Cantilene for cello & piano
- 1945 – Violin Sonata in G sharp major, op 20
- 1946 – Viola Sonata
- 1947 – Cello Sonata in A major
- 1947 – Elegy for cello & piano
- 1956 – Fantasia Concertante for violin and piano
- 1963 – Duo for oboe & clarinet
- 1966 – Concert Fantasy for viola and piano
- 1967 – Sonata for solo viola
- 1968 – Sonata for solo violin
- 1968 – Sonata for solo cello
- 1968 – Sonatina in B♭ major for clarinet and piano

=== Solo Piano ===
- 1932 – Fantasy
- 1934 – Four Silhouettes
- 1937 – Suite for piano
- 1939 – Impromptu
- 1940 – Intermezzo
- 1945 – Legend
- 1945 – Piano Sonata No.1 in B major
- 1947 – Scherzo in A major
- 1950 – Scherzo Fantastique
- 1952 – Musical Box
- 1955 – Twelve Preludes & Fugues
- 1964 – Piano Sonata No.2 in A♭ major
- 1965 – Zodiac suite for piano

=== Film Scores ===
- 1953 – The House that Jack Built
- 1953 – The Sea
- 1955 – Island of Steel
- 1959 – Jessy
- 1959 – The Mummy
- 1959 – The White Trap
- 1960 – Circus of Horrors
- 1964 – The Curse of the Mummy's Tomb
