= Camillo Hildebrand =

German composer and conductor

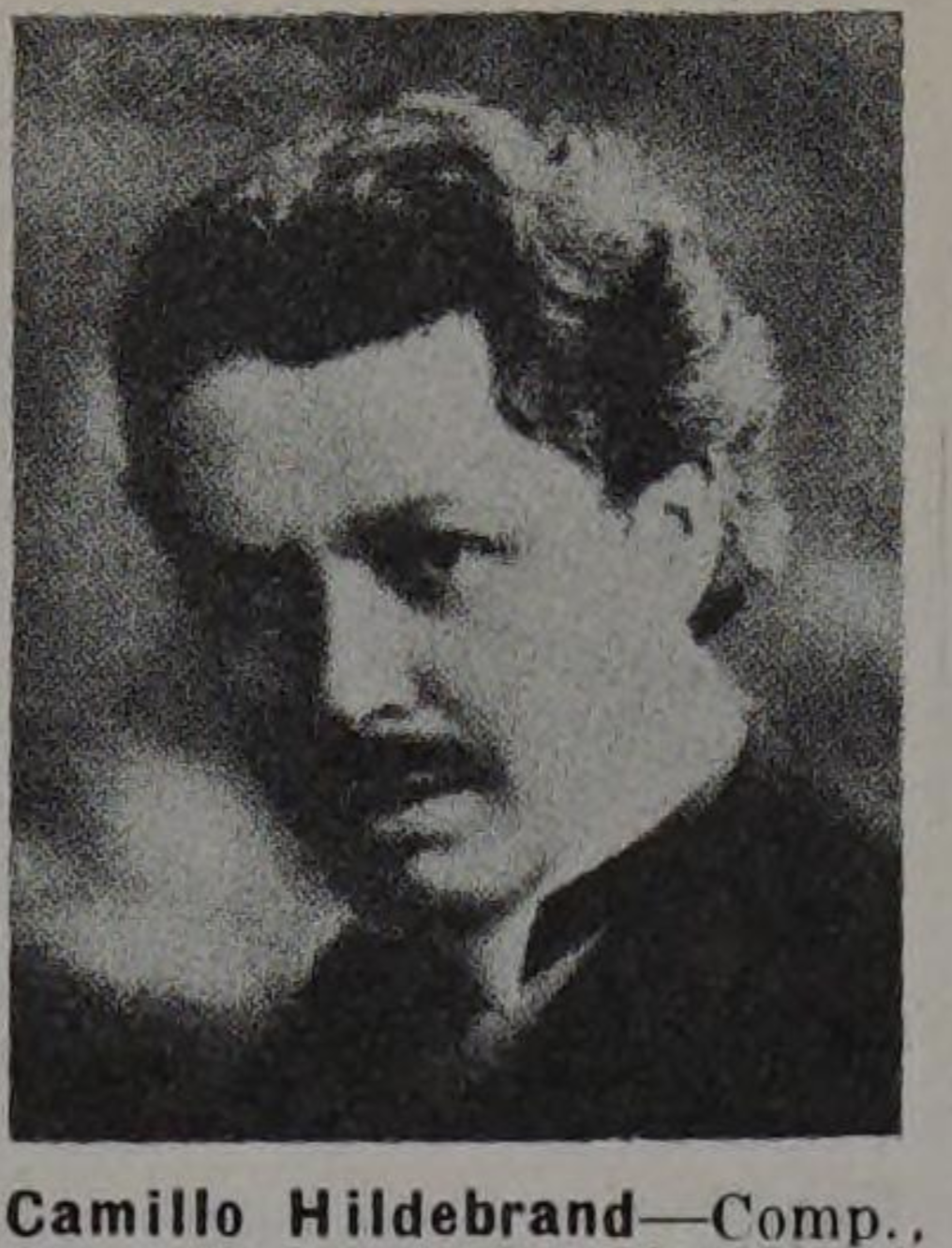
Camillo Hildebrand

Camillo Hildebrand (1872–1953) was a German composer and conductor of Czech origin. He was an opera conductor of the opera houses of Heidelberg, Mainz and Mannheim, as well as the Berlin Philharmonic and Blühner Orchestra, which he founded.

== Career ==
He graduated from the Prague Conservatory, where he was a student of Antonín Dvořák and Antonín Bennewitz. From 1892 to 1894, he worked as a répétiteur at Hoch Conservatory in Frankfurt am Main. From 1900 to 1901, he was the Kapellmeister of the opera theater in Olomouc, where he conducted the city's first production of Richard Wagner’s The Mastersingers of Nuremberg. He then conducted in Heidelberg, Mannheim, Aachen, Mainz, and from 1909 to 1910 was the General Music Director of Erfurt.

In 1912, he opened the new season at the Komische Oper Berlin with a production of Goethe’s tragedy Egmont with music by Ludwig van Beethoven. After that, until 1919, he conducted the Berlin Philharmonic Orchestra, with which he made several recordings in 1914 (works by Wagner, Beethoven, Felix Mendelssohn, Luigi Boccherini, Edvard Grieg and Camille Saint-Saëns). In April 1914, under Hildebrand's direction, the orchestra opened its first cycle of Beethoven concerts in its history, performing the first two symphonies and the third piano concerto (with Artur Schnabel as soloist). From 1919 to 1921, he led the city orchestra and opera in Freiburg before returning to Berlin and heading the Blüthner Orchestra from 1921 to 1925. From 1928 to 1932, he was the artistic director of the Orchestral Society of Berlin Friends of Music, Berlin's oldest amateur orchestra. After that, he performed with various ensembles as a guest conductor and from 1936 to 1937 was the general music director of Swinemünde. In 1944 he retired to Sondershausen.

Hildebrand's compositional legacy included the opera Verheißung, which was staged in Rostock in 1909, as well as lieder, orchestral, piano and choral works. During the Third Reich, he wrote several Nazi songs and marches.

== Personal life ==
He married the distinguished soprano Henni Linkenbach.

== Works (selection) ==
- 1909: Verheißung. Opera. Text by J. Löwenstein
- 1940: Sängerfestouvertüre für Orchester und Chor
- ca. 1940: Rund um Neapel: Fünf Impressionen in Form einer Suite for orchestra
- 1953: Sonnenfahrt for male choir
