= Helmut Gernsheim =

Photographer and historian (1913 –1995)

- Felix H. Man (1945) Portrait of Helmut Gernsheim
- Born: 1 March 1913; Munich, Germany
- Died: 20 July 1995 (aged 82); Switzerland
- Education: Ludwig-Maximilians-Universität München, State School of Photography, Munich
- Occupations: photographer and photo historian
- Known for: photography collection
- Spouses: Alison Eames; Irene Guenin

Helmut Erich Robert Kuno Gernsheim (1 March 1913 – 20 July 1995) was a historian of photography, a collector and a photographer.

== Early life and education ==
Born in Munich, Germany, he was the third son of the academic librarian Karl Gernsheim and his wife Hermine Scholz. He studied art history at the Ludwig-Maximilians-Universität München. He took up photography in 1934 at the urging of his brother, de:Walter Gernsheim, who thought it a more practical profession for someone from a partially Jewish background who intended to leave Nazi Germany. He graduated from the State School of Photography, Munich, after two years' study. Beginning in the late 1930s, he made commercial work, some in colour using the German Uvachrome process, before going to Paris for an exhibition of his work and then to London to work on commissions from the National Gallery, for Rolls-Royce and the shipping line P&O.

== Second World War ==
At the outset of the Second World War, Gernsheim was deported to Australia on the HMT Dunera and interned as a "friendly enemy alien" for a year at Hay in New South Wales, along with other German nationals including the artist Ludwig Hirschfeld Mack of the Bauhaus, Heinz Henghes (sculptor), Hein Heckroth (film and stage designer), George Teltscher (graphic artist), Klaus Friedeberger (painter), tenor Erich Liffmann, the composer Ray Martin, the artist Johannes Koelz, the photographers Henry Talbot and Hans Axel, the art historians Franz Phillipp and Ernst Kitzinger, the author Ulrich Boschwitz, the furniture designers Fred Lowen and Ernst Roedeck, and Erwin Fabian (sculptor). While interned, he lectured other internees on the aesthetics of photography and wrote his critique on photography, New Photo Vision, which was published in 1942 and led to his becoming a friend of the fellow critic and historian Beaumont Newhall.

Gernsheim earned his release from internment by volunteering to work for the National Buildings Record, returning to London in 1942 to photograph important monuments with a view to revealing their artistic merits. These photographs became the basis of two more books. They were praised by critics including Kenneth Clark and Nikolaus Pevsner and in 1943 were described by The Architectural Review as "nothing short of a rediscovery of the Baroque monuments". Around this time, he won a coveted position with the Warburg Institute as the chief photographer for the London area. He joined The Royal Photographic Society in 1940 became a Fellow (FRPS) in 1942.

He met his future wife, Alison, in 1938 and, after she and her first husband, Blen Williams, divorced, they set up home together in 1942 and married at the end of the war. Gernsheim was granted British citizenship in 1946 and continued to live in London for most of his life.

== Photo collector and historian ==
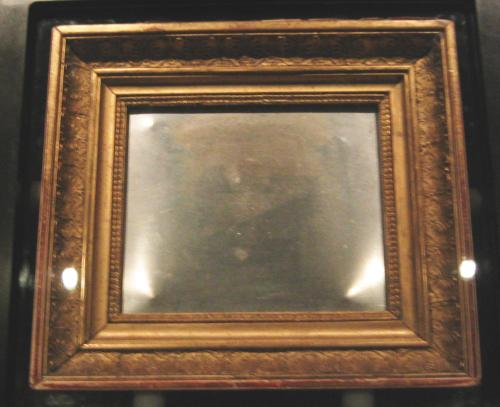
Nicéphore Niépce (1827) View from the window at Le Gras

Though having studied art history, Gernsheim's inclination toward a specialisation in photography history came from having been a photographer himself.

In 1945, at Beaumont Newhall's prompting, Helmut and Alison Gernsheim started collecting the works of historic photographers, especially British ones, which were disappearing. They amassed a huge collection containing work by Julia Margaret Cameron, Alvin Langdon Coburn, Hill & Adamson, William Henry Fox Talbot and Louis Daguerre. They rediscovered the long-lost hobby of Lewis Carroll when, in 1947, Gernsheim stumbled across an album of Carroll's portraits in a junk shop.

=== The History of Photography ===
Ultimately this collection, along with an estimated 3–4 million words of notes on the subject, led to his writing the 180,000-word book The History of Photography. When the first edition was published by the OUP in 1955 it became an instant classic and the definitive reference work for historians of photography for decades afterwards, being described by Beaumont Newhall as "a milestone in the history of photography" and by other reviewers as "the photographer's bible" and "an encyclopaedic work".

The Gernsheims continued to publish numerous articles and books on various aspects of photography and a variety of photographers (see Publications below) and often in collaboration, for instance, in 1966, working with Alvin Langdon Coburn to complete an autobiography, and in 1983 with Bill Jay on Photographers Photographed

=== The first photograph ===
Along the way, in 1952 Gernsheim rediscovered the long-lost world's first surviving permanent photograph from nature, created by Joseph Nicéphore Niépce in 1827 (View from the Window at Le Gras).

== Later life, death ==
Alison Gernsheim died on 27 March 1969 and Helmut Gernsheim remarried in 1971 to Irène Guénin. He continued a positive interest in photography, vigorously supporting the establishment of photographic galleries and museums in the USA and Britain, including The Photographers' Gallery under Sue Davies in 1971 and the National Museum of Photography Film and Television under Colin Ford in 1983.

Helmut Gernsheim died on 20 July 1995.

== Legacy ==
Ultimately, Gernsheim needed to find a home for his vast collection of over 33,000 photographs, 4,000 books, research notes, his own correspondence, and collected correspondence including letters by Daguerre and Fox Talbot. He sought unsuccessfully to found a national museum of photography in the UK (ultimately a National Museum did not happen until 1983). In the end, after many fruitless discussions with authorities and potential sponsors in several countries, he sold everything to the University of Texas at Austin in 1963 where it formed the basis of a new Department of Photography at the Humanities Research Center. His collection of modern photography was retained by him and ultimately passed to the Forum Internationale Photographie (FIP) at the Reiss-Engelhorn-Museen, Mannheim.

In 1965 the exhibition, Helmut Gernsheim's Duplicate Collection Classic Camera, also incorporating Professor Helmer Bäckström's historical collection acquired in 1964, became the foundation of Sweden's Fotografiska Museet formally established in 1971. Museum Folkwang, Essen, Germany, a division of the Museum of Modern Art, is one of Germany's most important collections of photographs, begun after its first exhibition of photographs from Gernsheim's collection surveying over 100 years of photography, and following which Otto Steinert purchased works by portrait photographer Hugo Erfurth and the Neue Sachlichkeit (New Objectivity) photographs of Albert Renger-Patzsch augmenting images from pioneers of photography David Octavius Hill and Robert Adamson he had acquired in 1961. Ten years later, the Museum contained nearly 4,000 photographs.

Photographs attributed to Gernsheim are held in the Conway Library at The Courtauld Institute of Art whose archive, primarily of architectural images, is being digitised under the wider Courtauld connects project.

== Honors and awards ==
- 1959: The Kulturpreis (Cultural Award) from the German Society for Photography (DGPh), with Robert Janker
- 1968: appointed consultant to Encyclopædia Britannica
- 1975: elected to the Committee, Fondation pour la Photographie Suisse
- 1976: elected to the advisory committee of the journal History of Photography
- 1979: Distinguished Visiting Professor at the University of Texas
- 1980: Academician and Gold Medal of the Academia Italia delle Arti, Salsomaggiore
- 1980: Honorary Member of the Daguerre Club, Frankfurt.
- 1981: Distinguished Visiting Professor at University of Arizona
- Honorary Fellow of the Photographic Historical Society of New York
- Honorary Fellow of the Club Daguerre, Frankfurt
- In 2002 Gernsheim was posthumously inducted into the International Photography Hall of Fame and Museum.

== Publications ==
- The history men: Helmut Gernsheim and Nicéphore Niépce 2013 Graham Harrison Photo Histories
- Alvin Langdon Coburn: Photographer, with Alison Gernsheim, New York: Praeger, 1966.
- Beautiful London, New York: Phaidon, 1950. (photographs by Helmut Gernsheim)
- Churchill: His Life in Photographs, Helmut Gernsheim and Randolph S. Churchill, eds., London, Weidenfeld and Nicolson 1955.
- A Concise History of Photography, with Alison Gernsheim, The World of Art Library series. London: Thames & Hudson, 1965.
- Creative Photography: Aesthetic Trends 1839–1960, London: Faber & Faber Limited, 1962.
- Edward VII and Queen Alexandra: A Biography in Word and Picture, with Alison Gernsheim, London: Frederick Muller, 1962.
- Focus on Architecture and Sculpture, an original approach to the photography of architecture and sculpture, London: Fountain Press, 1949.
- Fotografia Artistica: Tendinte Estetice 1839–1960, Bucuresti: Editura Meridiane 1970.
- Historic Events 1839–1939, with Alison Gernsheim, London: Longmans, Green & Co., 1960.
- The History of Photography From the Earliest Use of the Camera Obscura in the Eleventh Century up to 1914 with Alison Gernsheim, London: Oxford University Press 1955; revised edition Thames & Hudson. 1969
- Incunabula of British Photographic Literature: A Bibliography of British Photographic Literature 1839–75 and British Books Illustrated with Original Photographs, London and Berkeley: Scolar Press in association with Derbyshire College of Higher Education 1984.
- Julia Margaret Cameron; her life and photographic work, London: Fountain Press, 1948.
- L. J. M. Daguerre. The History of the Diorama and the Daguerreotype, with Alison Gernsheim, London: Secker & Warburg, 1956. (With “Bibliography of Daguerre's Instruction Manuals” by Beaumont Newhall.)
- Lewis Carroll, photographer, London: Max Parrish, 1949.
- The Man Behind the Camera, Helmut Gernsheim, ed. London: Fountain Press [November] 1948 (foreword by Rathbone Holme). (With chapters on Cecil Beaton, Gernsheim, E.O. Hoppé, Angus McBean, Felix H. Man, Mrs. K.M. Parsons, W. Suchitzky, Harold White, and J. Allan Cash.)
- Masterpieces of Victorian Photography, London: Phaidon Press, 1951.
- The New Photo Vision, London: Fountain Press, 1942.
- The Origins of Photography, New York: Thames & Hudson, 1982.
- The Recording Eye. A Hundred Years of Great Events as Seen by the Camera, 1839–1939, with Alison Gernsheim, New York: Putnam, 1960.
- Roger Fenton, Photographer of the Crimean War. His Photographs and his Letters from The Crimea, with Alison Gernsheim, London: Secker & Warburg, 1954.
- Those Impossible English, with Alison Gernsheim, London: Weidenfeld & Nicolson, 1952. (text: Quentin Bell; photographs selected by Helmut and Alison Gernsheim).
- Victoria R. A Biography with Four Hundred Illustrations based on her Personal Photograph Albums, with Alison Gernsheim, New York: G. P. Putnam's Sons, 1959.
- Jay, Bill, Gernsheim, Helmut (1983). Photographers photographed. Salt Lake City: Peregrine Smith Books. OCLC 470015567.
