= Baldelli =

Baldelli may refer to:

- Ferdinando Baldelli (1886–1963), Italian Catholic Bishop
- Fortunato Baldelli (1935–2012), Italian Catholic Cardinal
- Giovanni Baldelli (1914–1986), Italian anarchist
- Lisa Baldelli-Hunt (born 1962), American politician
- Rocco Baldelli (born 1981), American baseball player
- Simone Baldelli (born 1976), Italian politician

See also:

- Baldelli ceramics
