= Johannes Matthaeus Koelz =

German-British artist

Johannes Matthaeus Koelz John Matthew Kelts
- Born: 31 March 1895; Mühldorf am Inn, Upper Bavaria, Germany
- Died: 3 July 1971 (aged 76); Stoke on Trent, Staffordshire, England
- Education: Academy of Fine Arts, Munich
- Occupation: Artist
- Spouse: Claire Helen Treu (1890–1957)
- Children: Siegfried Koelz (1923–2005) and one daughter born 1936

Johannes Matthaeus Koelz (31 March 1895 – 3 July 1971) was a German-British artist, originally from Upper Bavaria. His career peaked during the middle 1930s. Little more was heard of him after he fled to England in 1937, and after he died he was generally forgotten. That changed more than a generation later when a portrait-sketch that he had drawn of Adolf Hitler was found in a private collection. It was known that he had been offered a fabulously fat fee and sufficient access to paint the leader in 1936 or 1937, but it was widely accepted that he had turned down the offer, after casual mention was made that he would be required, as a courtesy, to wear a "brown shirt" party uniform in Hitler's presence. Disagreement persists among experts as to whether he somehow gained the necessary access after all, or whether the painting was produced - in total defiance of the artist's known preferences - from one or more of the many photographs of Hitler that were produced during this period. Apart from the Hitler sketch, Koelz is primarily known for his imposing church art, and in particular for the vast anti-war triptych, "Thou Shalt Not Kill". Immediately before escaping the country, he arranged and oversaw the cutting of the work into sixteen or twenty pieces, at the village sawmill. The pieces were secretly distributed to friends and family members: he hoped thereby to preserve the work from the unsympathetic attentions of the security services. ("Pacifist propaganda" was out of favour with the political class at the time.) Much later, in 1998, four of the pieces were donated by his daughter to the New Walk Art Gallery in Leicester, England. According to some sources two more pieces subsequently turned up. This was enough, with the help of (at that time) modern computer-aided imaging techniques and an old photograph taken while the composition was still not quite finished, for an arresting digitally remastered copy of it to be contrived.

== Life ==
=== Provenance and early years ===
Johannes Matthaeus Koelz was born into a Catholic family, and grew towards adulthood through the confident years of the Wilhelmine pomp, in Mühldorf. Mühldorf was a small ancient manufacturing town set on the north bank of the River Inn in the rich farmland between German Munich (to the west) and Austrian Salzburg (to the south). Relatively little is known of his childhood. There are references to his having become a "committed sportsman" and a "fitness obsessive" with an appetite for the rural outdoor life. He also showed indications of being a keen and capable artist from an early age. In normal times he would have moved on from school to study at the Fine Arts Academy in Munich; but by 1914 the times were far from normal. A couple of months after his nineteenth birthday war broke out. His enrolment at the prestigious academy was deferred until November 1918. On 23 January 1915 Koelz was conscripted for military service, joining the seventh company of the Bavarian Infantry Regiment. He was sent to fight on the so-called "Western Front" where he served until the war ended. His brother, also sent to fight, was killed in action: Johannes Koelz survived, but lost his religion. It is known that he was awarded the "Iron Cross - second class" in recognition of the courage he displayed in the heat of battle in northern France, after he rescued a wounded soldier from behind enemy line during 1916. However, the more expressive and informative testimony to his three years on the frontline is probably that provided by the art he produced between the wars.

=== Student policeman ===
Despite his later reputation as an anti-militarist, Koelz continued to serve as an officer in the army for a year or so after the war ended. He joined the police service in 1919, working over the next few years both as a city police officer in Munich and as a member of the Bavarian Mountain Police. At one point he was sent to Berlin-Spandau to work at the Police School there as a trainer in unarmed combat. In parallel to his police career, he was now able to pursue his studies at the Munich Fine Arts Academy. He became a "Meisterschüler" (loosely, "advanced student") of Franz Stuck and of Olaf Gulbransson. This led him away from the fashionable and brutal forms of expressionism associated with Otto Dix and other contemporaries whose work during the 1920s is frequently seen as an angry rejection of the forces that had taken Europe to war in 1914. Koelz's artistic training and, presumably, his own inclinations and upbringing, led him back to the naturalism which, even in Germany, was widely viewed as having fallen out a fashion at least a generation earlier.

In 1922 he met Claire Helen Treu (1890–1957), who already had three children by her first husband. They teamed up together and their son Siegfried (always known to friends and family a 'Fred') was born in 1923, having been conceived, as Fred would later insist, when his mother was still married to her first husband. In 1925 they set up home together on the edge of the village of Hohenbrunn, then just outside Munich (into which, subsequently, it has becoming progressively ever more engulfed). The Koelz family at this time consisted of three daughters from the first marriage and one infant son from the second. Claire had been born into a wealthy family, but the circumstances of the ending of her first marriage had left her cut off financially by her parents, and the couple's new home was a small house which had been built to be used as a "holiday cottage" - albeit with a plot of land large enough to feed the family through most of the year - rather than as a family home. Their second child together, a daughter, would be born in 1936. She would grow up believing that her conception had resulted from "a mistake". The marriage of Johannes and Claire Koelz was, in the assessment of their daughter, an exceptionally loving and close one. Koelz concentrated more and more on his painting, with a focus on still life and portraiture, for which there was a ready market in Germany.

In March 1933 Koelz relocated with his family to Maribor, a traditionally German-speaking town which following the dissolution of the Austrian empire had ended up as a frontier town in the northern edge of Yugoslavia. Here they acquired an agricultural small holding, and Koelz was able to construct a studio. He was already working obsessively on "Du Sollst Nicht Töten", a vast anti-war triptych which he would complete and destroy in 1937. Following the assassination of King Alexander Koelz was able to make a death mask of the deceased former monarch: he sold many copies, giving rise to a useful supplementary revenue stream. The Koelz family returned abruptly to Hohenbrunn in 1935. This "homecoming" may have been in connection with reported threats by the German government to confiscate Koelz's property in Hohenbrunn if he remained any longer in Yugoslavia. On the evidence of his surviving work, the early 1930s were a period of artistic self-discovery and development for Koelz.

=== Thou Shouldst Not Kill ===
Between approximately 1930 and 1937 Koelz worked on his oil-on-wood triptych "Du Sollst Nicht Töten" ("Thou Shouldst Not Kill"), remarkable in terms both of its size and of its visual impact, measuring approximately 230 × 510 cm (so taller than a man and more than twice as wide as that). Clearly inspired by medieval altarpieces focused on the crucifixion or enthronement in Heaven of Christ the King, the artist moved on to address a more secular and morally conflicted generation. The central panel depicts a crucified soldier, still wearing his gas mask. The side panels depicted not the kneeling saints familiar from medieval altar pieces, but kneeling soldiers in prayer, clearly representing the German armies on one side and the armies of the Anglo-French-Russian armies on the other. Around and in front of the soldiers cluster representative members of the civilian populations in whose names the wartime killing is performed. Traditional religion is represented by figures above the assembled soldiers on the side panels, identified as Christian priests blessing the weapons of war. The work was clearly designed to shock, and after the coming to power of the Hitler government it would certainly have shocked the security services if they had discovered it, with consequences endangering the artist and others involved on producing or displaying it. "Du Sollst Nicht Töten" was undertaken, at least during the later years of its production, in Koelz's home at Hohenbrunn. It is not known whether, at least when he started on it, Koelz had any clear ideas as to where it should be displayed. After 1933 the chances of displaying it anywhere until after the next dramatic change in the political weather became vanishingly small, but the artist was not dissuaded from completing it by Germany's political switch to post-democratic populism.

=== Régime change ===
In January 1933 the Hitler government took power. This was followed by a rapid transformation from democracy under a republican constitution to tyranny under a one-party dictatorship. Koelz had grown up surrounded by traditionalist nationalism of small-town Germany, and Anglo-Saxon commentators infer that his war-time heroics, which made him a worthy heir of the German military tradition, also made him an unlikely pacifist. But his experiences on the wartime front line had indeed turned him into a committed anti-militarist. It is clear from his experiences during the 1930s that he had little sympathy with the twentieth century populism of a Hitler. It was his interactions with the Hitler government and its agencies that transformed his life, during the later 1930s.

=== Hitler portrait? ===
It was probably during 1936 that Koelz received a visit from Heinrich Berg, his agent, accompanied by an important-looking man wearing a general's uniform. The important man was Gauleiter Adolf Wagner, a top-level party official and regional government administrator. Wagner was also a personal friend of the leader. He arrived with an offer. Koelz was invited to paint a portrait of Hitler suitable for inclusion at the front of a "Christmas Book" for distribution across the German-speaking world. It was evidently a prestige project. Koelz would later recall that the fee offered was "truly seductive". He would be favoured with no fewer than eight sittings. There was only one obvious downside. He would be expected to "don the little brown [Nazi] shirt". The commission was, according to one source respectfully declined. According to his son there was nothing respectful about Koelz's reaction: "Du kannst mich Götz von Berlichingen", a message as disrespectful as, in today's terms, it is untranslatable. In 1971 it emerged that Koelz had indeed "produced a preliminary drawing for the proposed painting", when the work was discovered among the personal effect of Barbara Demmell in Germany. Barbara Demmell's mother-in-law had been a close friend of Claire Koelz, the artist's wife. Opinions are divided over whether this preliminary portrait was based on a photograph, or whether Koelz had somehow managed to organise at least one sitting with the intended subject of the portrait after all.

=== Trouble ===
There are several different perspectives on Koelz's serious falling out with the German security establishment during the later 1930s, and the truth of the matter is likely to be found in some combination of several factors that included Koelz's powerful self-belief and disinclination, irrespective of the circumstances, to keep his opinions to himself. At the start of the 1930s Koelz's circle of friends had included Ernst Röhm, a friend and political ally of Adolf Hitler, and a co-founder of the feared paramilitary "Sturmabteilung" / SA organisation. By 1934 Hitler had come to see Röhm as a potential rival, so had his former friend and a large number of his followers arrested and murdered. It is not impossible that if, later, Hitler or one of his henchmen heard rumours that Koelz had expressed sympathy for communist ideas, or was otherwise displeased by something Koelz did or said, he will have remembered that Koelz had been a friend of Röhm. Long before the killing of Röhm, in 1923, when Koelz had still been a member of the security services, he had been the officer in charge of one of the machine-gun positions involved when eighteen Hitlerites were mown down as they marched along the street during the so-called "Beer Hall Putsch" of November 1923. At some point Koelz's involvement came to the party's attention, and by 1938 his name was on a party blacklist. Nevertheless, it is clear that neither the National Socialist movement nor the security services always spoke with a single voice, and a number of people - including, on one occasion, a lower court judge - must have taken great personal risks in order to ensure that Koelz was permitted to escape at the end of 1937 when the time came for him to be arrested.

After the episode of the Hitler portrait commission, Koelz applied for what he assumed would be a routine visa renewal in order to visit Italy. He needed to supervise the printing of some illustrations for his publisher. He made his way to the appropriate department of the main police station in Munich to have the visa renewal attended to. After a long wait he was invited into a little meeting room for a discussion with an Inspector Müller of the Political Police. The serious looking man behind the desk looked familiar, and he tried to recall where he had seen that face before. Then he had a flash-back to 1916 and Douaumont. His interlocutor was Corporal Müller whom he had last seen immobilised, with a leg reduced to pulp, during the terrible Battle of Verdun. After determining that the injured corporal was breathing and still alive, Koelz had carried him away from danger and, both men seem to have agreed, saved his life by doing so. Evidently Inspector Müller had recognised his rescuer of two decades earlier. He gazed unblinkingly at Koelz for a few seconds before confiscating his passport and holding in front of him an arrest warrant on which Koelz could pick out the phrase "pacifist propaganda". Müller then placed the documents back in his desk drawer and returned his steady gaze to the man sitting opposite him: "It will stay there for 48 hours. Good bye and Good luck, Captain". He then stood to attention, with some difficulty on account of his wooden leg, and in silence: Koelz did the same. Koelz was then escorted to the main entrance of the police station. He made for the nearby "Frauenkirche" (Catholic cathedral) and went in to sit and sort out his thoughts. He had indeed published "some fifty satirical poems of anti-military tendency", though it would never become obvious to him how the security services had linked him to "Johannes Matthaeus", and had thereby managed to track back to his own authorship of the scurrilous rhymes. He reflected then on the possibility that the "left-wing offices" of the publisher might have been raided.

He had forty-eight hours in which to leave the country. Koelz had recently completed eleven paintings of a twelve painting Stations of the Cross series for the little church in Hohenbrunn, which had been scheduled for consecration on 16 October 1938. He would be unable to participate in the ceremony, however. After receiving the warning from Inspector Müller he went home, grabbed his gun and took the family's much loved dog for her final walk. He would never forget the look of trusting incomprehension that appeared on her face after he fired the shot. He returned home by a long and indirect route, hoping that his wife and children should not see his uncontrolled weeping. He then took his vast "Du Sollst Nicht Töten" anti-war triptych to the local saw-mill where it was cut into sixteen or twenty sections by Andreas Knappich, the son of his friend who at that time still owned the sawmill. The anti-war message of the triptych was no longer acceptable to the government. The sections were secretly distributed among trusted friends and relations. Most remain lost. Meanwhile, Johannes Koelz, accompanied by his wife, their teenage son, and their infant daughter made their way to the frontier with Austria, still a separate country at this point. During his time in the army in the early 1920s he had undertaken border duty, so he knew all the crossing points and the likely locations for the stationing of border guards. Koelz was convinced that Austria would soon be incorporated into Germany (as in March 1938 it was), so they continued on, crossing illegally into Czechoslovakia. They made their home, for a time, in Prague. They found a small apartment for which they were obliged to pay three month's rent in advance, which virtually exhausted their funds. Koelz with his wife and their two children lived under circumstances of severe poverty even though, despite the problematic times through which they were living, Koelz continued to receive a steady trickle of portrait commissions. It was nevertheless a time during which, as Siegfried Koelz later recalled, one British pound sent by Clothilde (the middle of Claire Koelz's three daughters, who had already escaped to England) would keep the family fed for a week.

Since 1933 the Czechoslovak capital had become a place of refuge for large numbers of political refugees from Hitler's Germany, along with others who faced persecution because the German government had classified them as Jewish or "half-Jewish". In 1938 Prague, too, fell under German control. It was time to move on again: most of the political exiles fled to Moscow or Paris.

=== England ===
Koelz move with his family to the Netherlands, probably already intending to continue to England. However, the family were interned alongside several hundred German refugees - almost all Jewish - for three months in a large Rotterdam hotel. Their infant daughter was taken away and placed in an isolation hospital, having been diagnosed with Diphtheria, so they remained in South Holland until the child was released. On 14 April 1939 they arrived on the SS Batavier V (mail boat) at Gravesend. For Koelz the next six months were spent trying to find work and create a new life with his wife and children. As in Germany so in England, for an unknown artist the easiest work to find involved portraiture.

=== Enemy alien ===
War returned in September 1939. By that time the family were living in a little cottage in Oxted, a village a short distance outside London on its south side. War introduced a new set of challenges. As foreigners the Koelz family were viewed with suspicion: reports found their way back to Koelz and his wife that "the authorities" were making enquiries among their fellow-villagers about them. In May 1940 the invasion of France triggered an intensified suspicion of foreigners among the English, and in June 1940 thousands German political or racially defined refugees who had already escaped life-threatening persecution in Germany were identified as "enemy aliens", arrested and taken into detention under the terms of "Defence Regulation 18B". In July 1940 "two nice policemen" came for Johannes Koelz. Confident, at this stage, that his application to join the Royal Pioneer Corps had borne fruit, he insisted on taking his toothbrush with him, but little else. According to other reports he had a small amount of luggage when he left the house but during the first night away from home, spent trying to sleep under the rain on a hastily requisitioned Surrey race course, and then at an English dockside, detainees were relieved of most of their possessions by means of a succession of "searches". The family stayed behind in Surrey. Many of the enemy aliens rounded up at this time were confined in the relative safety provided by the Isle of Man, but some were transported to Canada or Australia. On 11 July 1940 the troopship "Dunera" - a recently adapted passenger liner - set sail from Liverpool, heading not for the Isle of Man but, as the prisoners crammed into the holds discovered some weeks later from a chance remark by the colonel in charge of the operation passed on to them, for Australia. There were 2,542 interned enemy aliens on board. Johannes Koelz was one of them. As they travelled, possessions that they had managed to hold on to through the Liverpool dockside procedures were stolen from them. Nevertheless, by the end of the voyage two of the victims still had their wrist watches, both carefully secured with tape on the insides of their groins. In Australia the internees were taken to one of two internment camps at Hay, a small town a couple of hundred kilometers inland from Sydney. Conditions on "HMT Dunera" had been brutal, but at the camps the prisoners were evidently spared further gratuitous violence and treated with human decency, though it was several days before the Australians assigned to guard and look after them could be persuaded that their prisoners, almost all of whom were Jewish, many of whom were middle aged, and some of whom had clearly never undertaken a day's military training in their lives, were not, after all, elite German soldiers who had arrived in London by parachute. The weather was warm and they received three good meals each day. According to fellow victims, Koelz was reserved and / or defeated in manner, but over time he came to be appreciated and revered for his patience and kindness. Social structures were developed among the internees with the encouragement of their overseers. Known to comrades, most of whom were significantly younger than he was, as "the professor" Koelz took to delivering lectures on art. He also revealed himself as a talented and meticulous craftsman by constructing a viola. The project took him many months: there was no obvious need for urgency.

=== Helping out against Hitler ===
During the first part of 1941 a combination of national embarrassment and indignation emerged within the English ruling class about the wholesale targeting and internment of supposed "enemy aliens", and the manner in which it had been implemented. By August 1941 Johannes Koelz was back in England. He was now accepted into the Royal Pioneer Corps, stationed first in Ilfracombe and later in Catterick, while Claire and the children tried to "fit in" at their Oxted home in war-time Surrey. Very little information survives over what Koelz actually did during his time with the Royal Pioneer Corps, though an article that appeared in the Yorkshire Post on 22 August 1942 demonstrates that he was still allowed time for art. In a review of an art exhibition at Darlington, published under the headline "Artists in khaki", the Post's reporter records his (or possibly her) disappointment that most of the works on show were only watercolours, but there were also "a few clever oils by clever artists now in khaki whom the fortunes - or misfortunes - of war have brought into our midst. Chief among this group of artists is Private M. Koelz, who has an outstanding oil portrait of a soldier playing a piano accordion against a background suggestive of Durham Cathedral. The picture is lively, well executed and strikes a happy note. And the price (tell it not in Gath) is £200".

In June 1944 he was transferred from the Royal Pioneer Corps, to the "Regional Air Operations Center". During 1945 and 1946 he was back in Bavaria, stationed in Bad Tölz where he worked for the US Military administrators in their "Civil Censorship Division".

=== At home in England ===
War ended in May 1945, leaving the western two thirds of Germany divided up into four separate military occupation zones between 1945 and 1949. On returning from his assignment with the Americans, Koelz remained with his wife and daughter in England. (Siegfried could for most purposes be considered "grown up" by this time and had left home.) Although he continued to work as an artist, the period was one of austerity, and there was no longer such a ready market for the portrait painting that had been the bread and butter work of artists in Germany before the war. In May 1949 he accepted a position as the Art Teacher at the "New Mills Grammar School" in Derbyshire, set in the hill country to the east of Manchester. He resigned the position less than a year later, in March 1950. It is not known why. After this, as a measure of growth returned to the economies of western Europe, he was able to focus, for the rest of his life, on painting and, increasingly during the 1950s, on sculpture.

=== Later years ===
Claire's death in 1957 was a blow from which Koelz never entirely recovered, despite the support of his youngest daughter and other family members. Much of his time, during his later years, was spent in Ireland where he purchased a cottage at Curraglass in County Cork, jointly with Albine who had long been a family friend and, in particular, a close friend of Claire's. Albine was now herself a widow. His relationship with Ireland was less conflicted than it had become with England after his experiences in 1941 as an "enemy alien". Also the people he met in Ireland seemed to take in their stride the strong German accent, which Koelz never lost. In England it still seemed sometimes to unnerve strangers whom he met. Nevertheless, for much of the year the two of them continued to live in England at Shelton, where he had settled in 1960 following Claire's death. It was at Shelton that Koelz fell ill at the start of 1971. After a slow death by cancer, the life of Johannes Matthaeus Koelz ended at nearby Stoke on Trent on 3 July 1971.
