= Hans Kronberger (physicist) =

British physicist

- Born: 28 July 1920; Linz, Austria
- Died: 29 September 1970 (aged 50); Wilmslow, Cheshire
- Citizenship: British
- Known for: Isotope separation
- Awards: Fellow of the Royal Society (1965); CBE (1966); Leverhulme Medal (1969)
- Scientific career
- Fields: Nuclear engineering
- Institutions: UK Atomic Energy Authority

Hans Kronberger CBE, FRS (28 July 1920 – 29 September 1970) was a British physicist. During his career with the UK Atomic Energy Authority he made important contributions to the development of the British thermonuclear bomb and nuclear power engineering, especially in the field of isotope separation.

== Early life ==
Hans Kronberger was born of Jewish parents in Linz, Austria, where his father was a leather merchant. Kronberger attended the Akademische Gymnasium in Linz, matriculating in Mathematics, Latin, Greek and German; he was a brilliant scholar. After the Anschluss, the annexation of Austria by Nazi Germany in 1938, Kronberger fled to Britain, arriving at Victoria Station with £10 and his school reports. He set about gaining entry to a university and was accepted at King's College, Newcastle, then a college of Durham University to read mechanical engineering. Following the fall of France, in May 1940 Kronberger was classified as a "friendly enemy alien" and interned on the Isle of Man. In July 1940, Kronberger, along with some 2500 refugees, was deported to Australia on board HMT Dunera; during the voyage he and others were subjected to ill treatment. In Australia, he was interned first at a camp in Hay, New South Wales, then from May 1941 at Tatura in Victoria. He was released and returned to Britain in 1942. He was tutored by refugee scientists at the camps and it was mainly due to this experience that he changed his course to physics on resuming his studies at Newcastle. He graduated in 1944 with the Stroud Prize in Physics.

== Career ==
In 1944 he moved to Birmingham University, joining Francis Simon's team in the Tube Alloys Project, the British programme to develop an atomic bomb. His PhD on isotope separation was completed in 1948. He then moved to the newly formed Atomic Energy Research Establishment at Harwell, where he continued to work on the separation of the isotopes of uranium, initially by gaseous diffusion and then using high speed centrifuges. In 1951 he moved to Capenhurst, where a large scale diffusion plant was being constructed. In two years, he was promoted to head of the Capenhurst laboratories, and then in 1958 he succeeded Leonard Rotherham as director of research and development of the industrial group of the United Kingdom Atomic Energy Authority.

In 1952, Britain committed itself to the development of a thermonuclear weapon. Kronberger's work on the separation of lithium isotopes was essential to the construction of the first warheads, which were tested at Christmas Island in 1957. A series of promotions within the UKAEA followed; he became Scientist in Chief of the Reactor Group in 1962 and the Member for Reactor Development of the UKAEA in 1969. Some of his work remains classified to this day, but there are many tributes to his inspiring leadership. He became involved with the promotion of peaceful uses of atomic energy and was a member of the Scientific Advisory Committee of the International Atomic Energy Agency. He contributed to feasibility studies on desalination of sea water and lectured on hydrostatic extrusion.

== Personal life ==
The Jewish population of Linz was expelled in July 1938. Kronberger's mother was killed at Schloss Hartheim and his sister was gassed at Auschwitz. His father survived imprisonment in the concentration camp at Theresienstadt. Kronberger became a naturalised British citizen in 1946. In 1951 he married Joan Hanson, a scientific assistant at Harwell, a widow with a young son, Paul; together they had two daughters, Zoë and Sarah. Joan was diagnosed with a brain tumour in 1952 and died in 1962. Kronberger was a talented pianist, and also a skilled mountaineer and skier.
