= Anton Ruh =

German ambassador and diplomat (1912–1964)

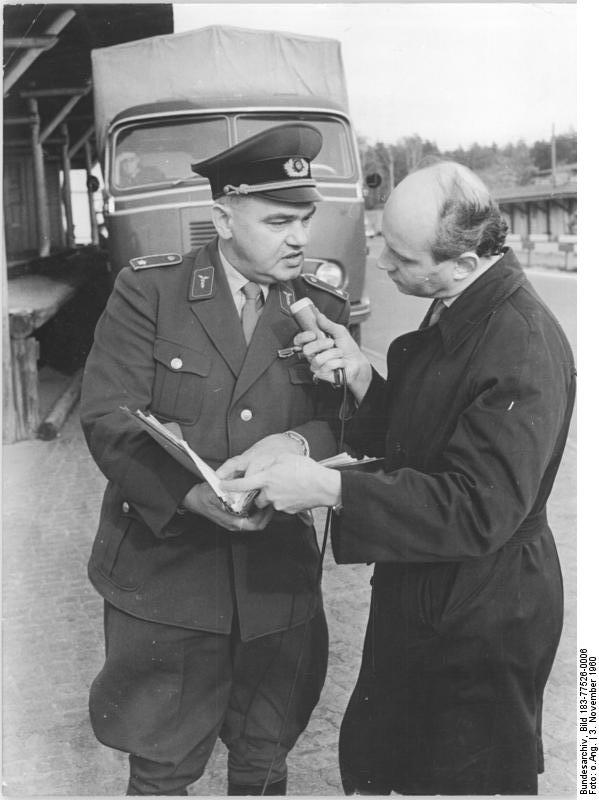
- Anton Ruh (left) on 3 November 1960

Ambassador of the German Democratic Republic to Romania
- In office 1963–1964
- Preceded by: Wilhelm Bick
- Succeeded by: Ewald Moldt

Personal details
- Born: 20 February 1912 Berlin, German Empire
- Died: 3 November 1964 (aged 52) Bucharest, Romania
- Resting place: Zentralfriedhof Friedrichsfelde
- Party: Socialist Unity Party of Germany (1946–); Communist Party of Germany (–1946)
- Other political affiliations: Communist Party of Austria (1933–1937)
- Spouse: Elisabeth Schwarz
- Awards: Silver Star (2004); Patriotic Order of Merit (1957)

Anton Ruh (20 February 1912 — 3 November 1964) was a German diplomat and a member of the German anti-Nazi resistance. He was the ambassador of the German Democratic Republic to Romania from 1963 to 1964.

== Life ==
Ruh was born on 20 February 1912 in Berlin into a working-class family from Austria. His father was killed in the First World War, leaving his mother, an active communist, to raise him alone. From 1918 to 1926, he attended elementary school in Berlin. Afterwards he worked as a lithographer and a welder.

In 1927, Ruh joined the Young Communist League of Germany (KJVD) and in 1929 he joined the Roter Frontkämpferbund. He would also join the Communist Party of Germany (KPD) around this time. In 1931, he was sentenced to six months in prison. Due to his Austrian citizenship, he was deported to Austria after his release. In 1933, Ruh was working for the KPD in Berlin and was arrested several times. From 1933 to 1937 he was a member of the Communist Party of Austria and Republikanischer Schutzbund. In 1934, Ruh fought in the Austrian Civil War against the government of Engelbert Dollfuss.

In 1934, Ruh fled to Czechoslovakia from Germany after the Gestapo discovered his role in producing and distributing anti-Nazi leaflets in the Berlin area. Despite being wanted by the Gestapo, he repeatedly travelled from Czechoslovakia to Berlin to deliver forged documents to German Jews and anti-Nazi dissidents. Following the occupation of the Sudetenland by Nazi Germany, he relocated to England in 1939. In England, he married fellow German emigrant Elisabeth Schwarz on 4 February 1940. At the beginning of the Second World War, he was interned by the British government as an "enemy alien" and deported to Australia on the Dunera for a year. After his release, he worked as a welder in a London armaments factory from 1942 to 1944.

At the end of 1944, he was recruited by the American Office of Strategic Services to support the German resistance and to gather intelligence inside Nazi Germany. He was parachuted into Germany, alongside his partner Paul Lindner, near Friesack. The pair provided intelligence about industrial activity, and the movements of Wehrmacht units until 25 April 1945. They were briefly imprisoned by the Red Army but were released after two months.

In 1946, Ruh joined the Socialist Unity Party of Germany (SED). Thereafter he worked for several years as an employee of the party. He then worked for the East German customs beginning in 1950. He became the first president of the Customs Administration of the German Democratic Republic when it was established in 1962. In 1957, he was awarded the Patriotic Order of Merit. In 1963, he was appointed as ambassador of the German Democratic Republic to Romania, replacing Wilhelm Bick.

Ruh died by suicide in Bucharest, Romania on 4 November 1964. He was buried at the Zentralfriedhof Friedrichsfelde in Berlin. He was succeeded as ambassador to Romania by Ewald Moldt.

In 2004, Ruh was posthumously awarded the Silver Star for his activities during the Second World War. The award was accepted by his son on 5 April 2006.
