= Fred Lowen =

Australian designer

Fred Lowen AM (1919–2005), born Fritz Karl Heinz Lowenstein, was a German-Australian designer and an inductee into the Design Institute of Australia Hall of Fame.

== Biography ==
Lowen was born as Fritz Karl Heinz Loewenstein in 1919 in Upper Silesia, then a part of Germany. Being Jewish, he fled Germany in 1938 to Belgium. In May 1940 he again fled the Nazis and made it to England. From there he was transported to Australia on the HMT Dunera arriving in Sydney on 6 September 1940. His father was Karl Loewenstein, later deported to Minsk Ghetto and Theresienstadt concentration camp.

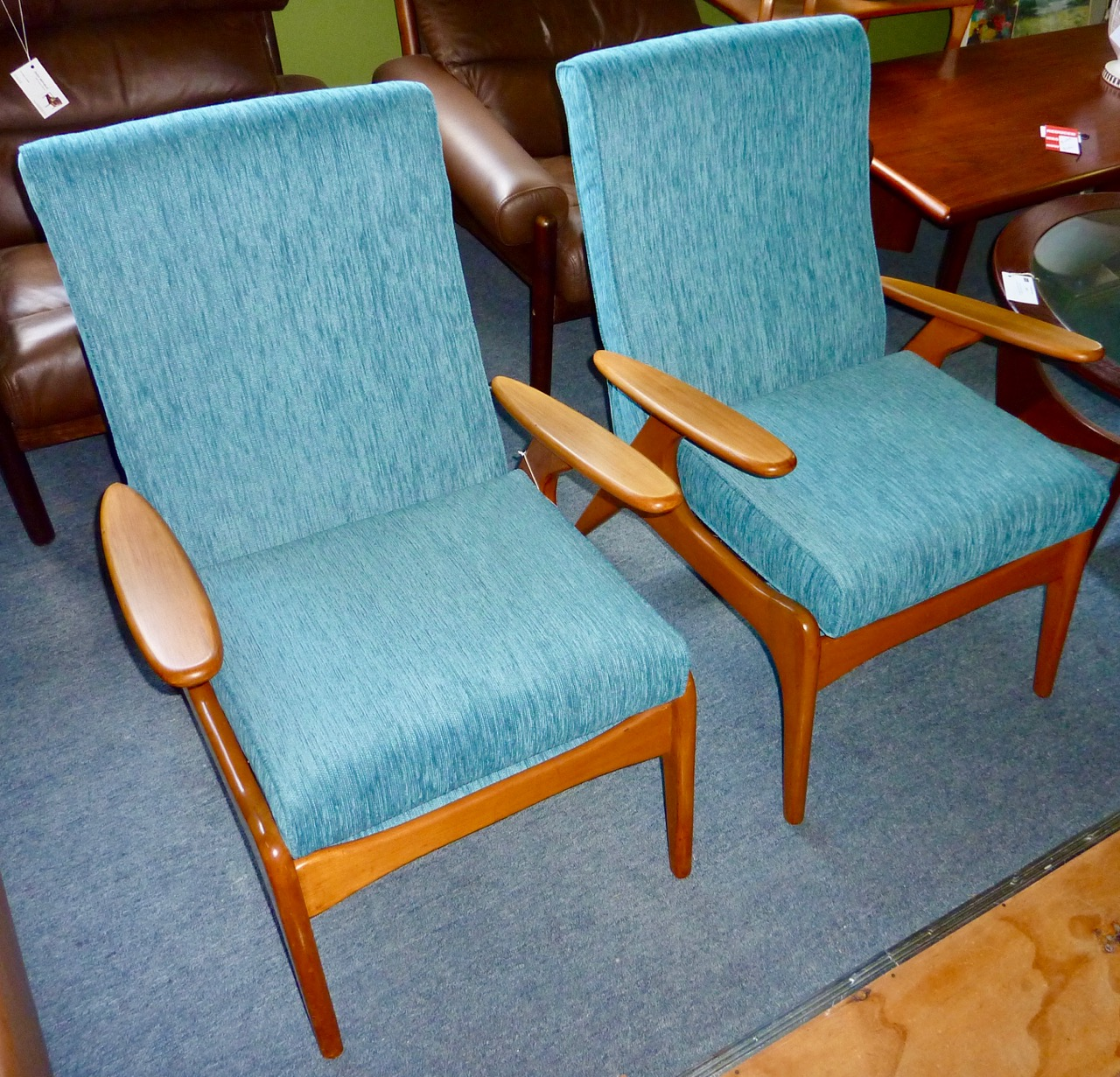
Pair of FLER SC55 Armchairs.

Starting in September 1945, Lowen designed and made wooden salad bowls, trays and lazy susans with Ernest Rodeck under the name of FLER. He manufactured a Fred Ward-designed chair for the Myer department store in Melbourne, Victoria. Between 1955 and 1958, Lowen designed the SC55 and SC58, the Aluminium Shell Chair, mahogany fold-out extension table and cane back chairs. The Narvik dining and lounge ranges were released in 1961, the Fleronde (1964/65), dining setting (1966/67), desk and chair for the Australian Exhibition at Expo 67 in Montreal, Quebec, Canada, and Flerena in 1968.

Lowen started Twen in 1968 and designed the Twen-1 range (1968) and Twen-2 in 1969. In 1970 Lowen designed the T-21 range and model T-4. In 1972 Twen was reborn as Tessa. The T-6 (1973), the T-8 range (with and without armrests) designed in 1976, and the T-9 followed. In the 1980s Lowen designed the Delmont (1980), Sarina (1981) and Sling (1981).

In May 1987 Lowen became a Member of the Order of Australia (AM). He wrote an autobiography Fred Lowen: Dunera Boy, Furniture Designer, Artist, which was published in 2001. He died in Melbourne in 2005.

== Gallery ==
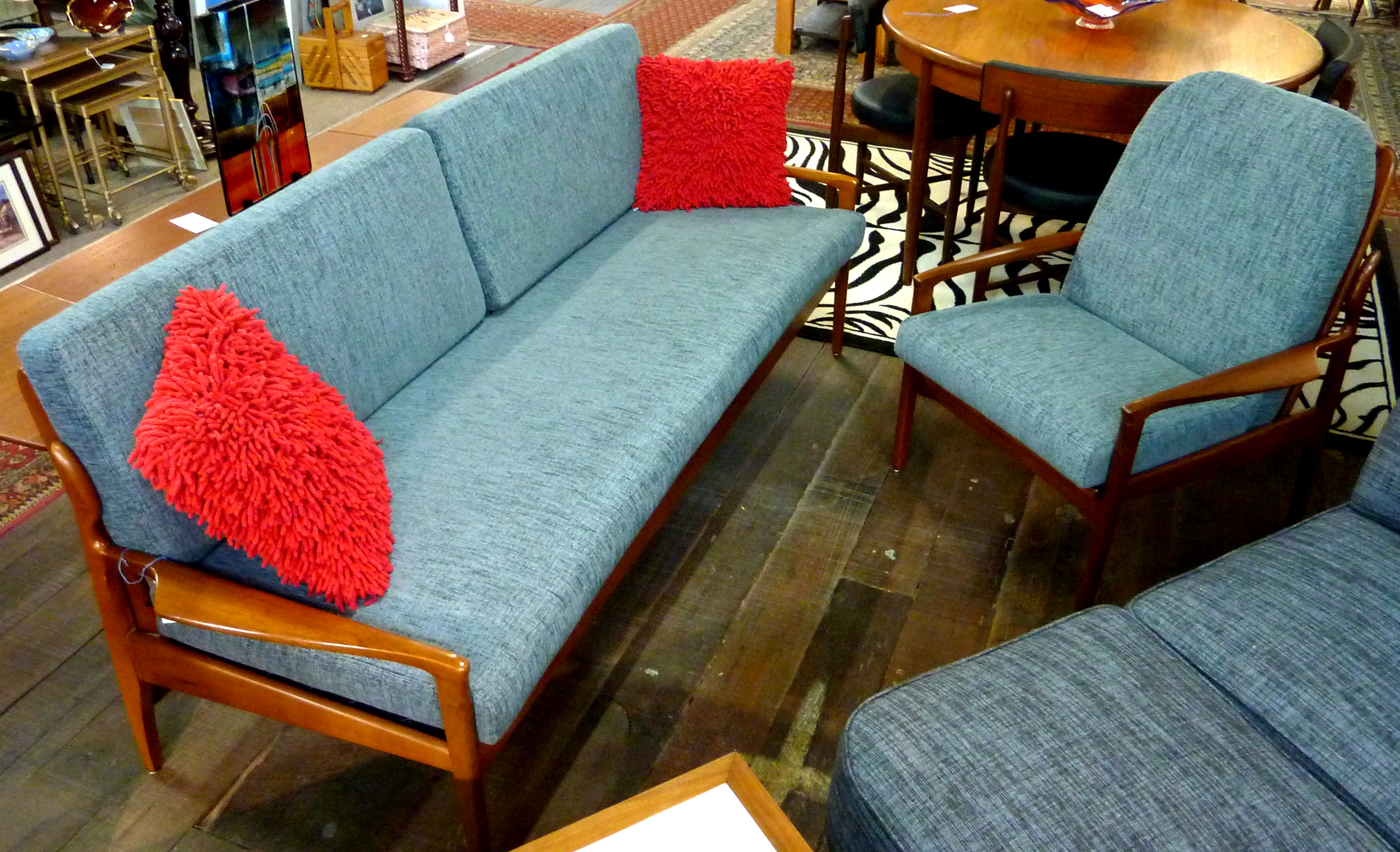
Narvik 3 Seat Blackwood Sofabed and 2 Matching Armchairs

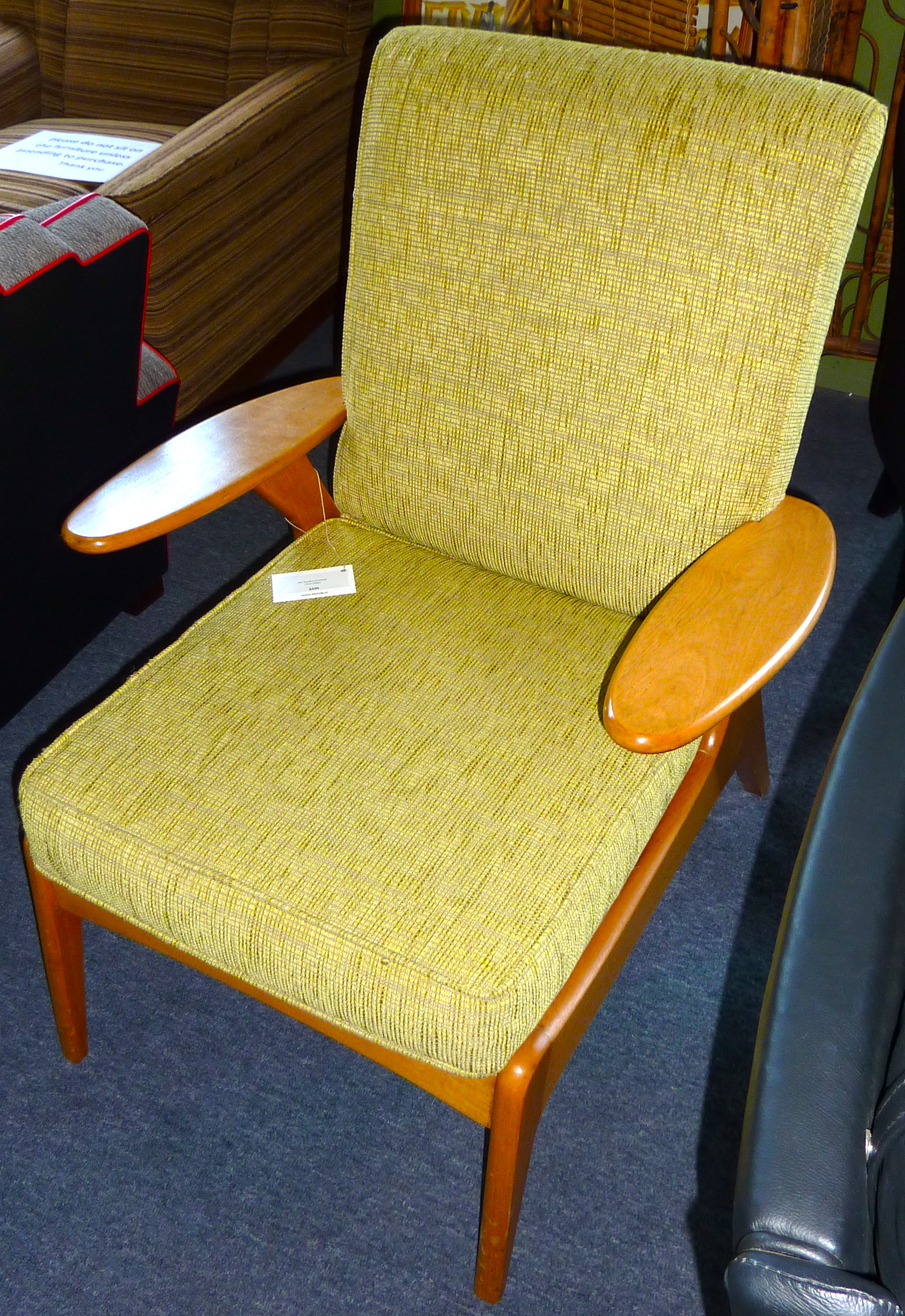
FLER Rocket Armchair Circa 1950s

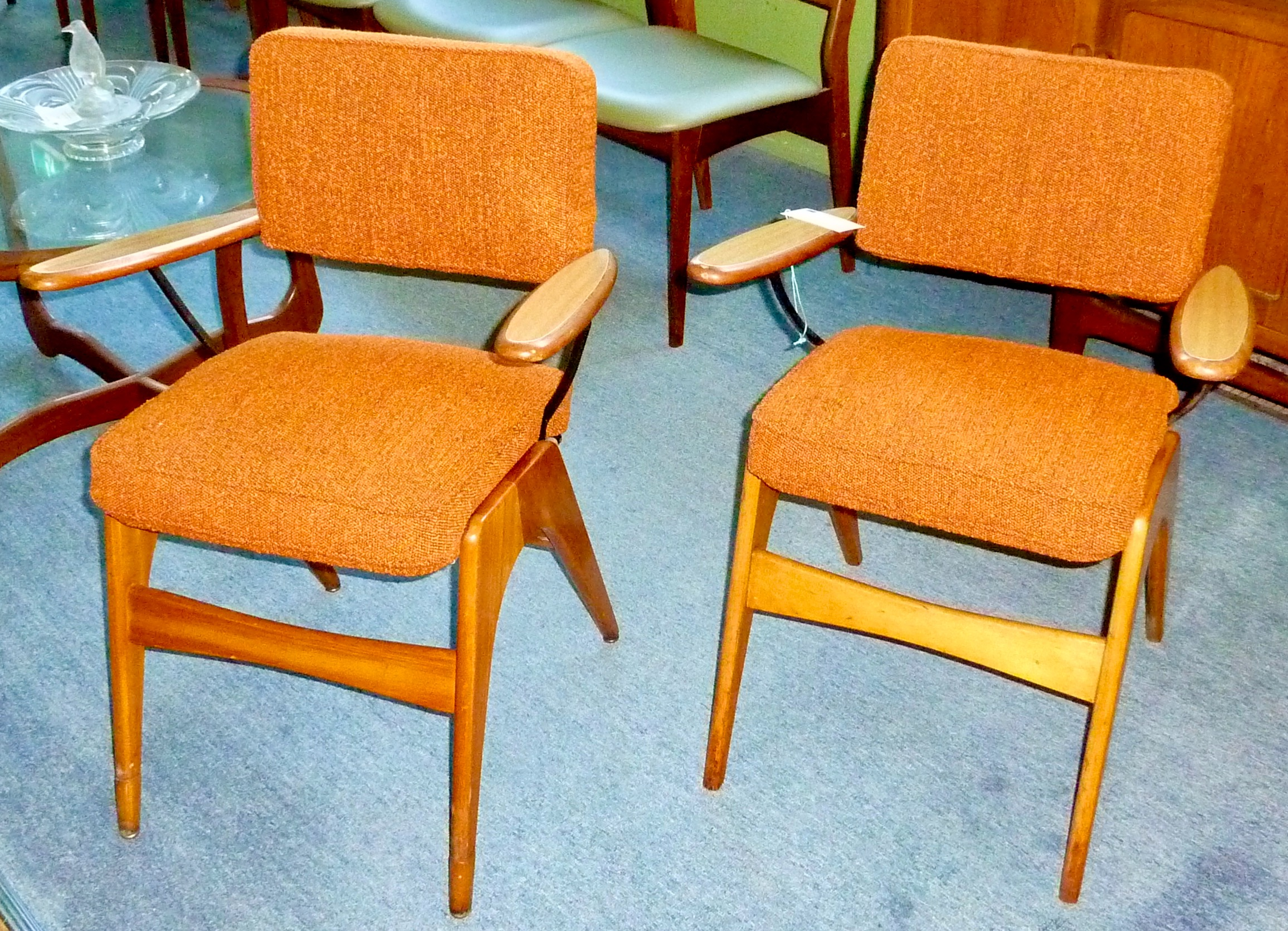
FLER Executive TV Chairs

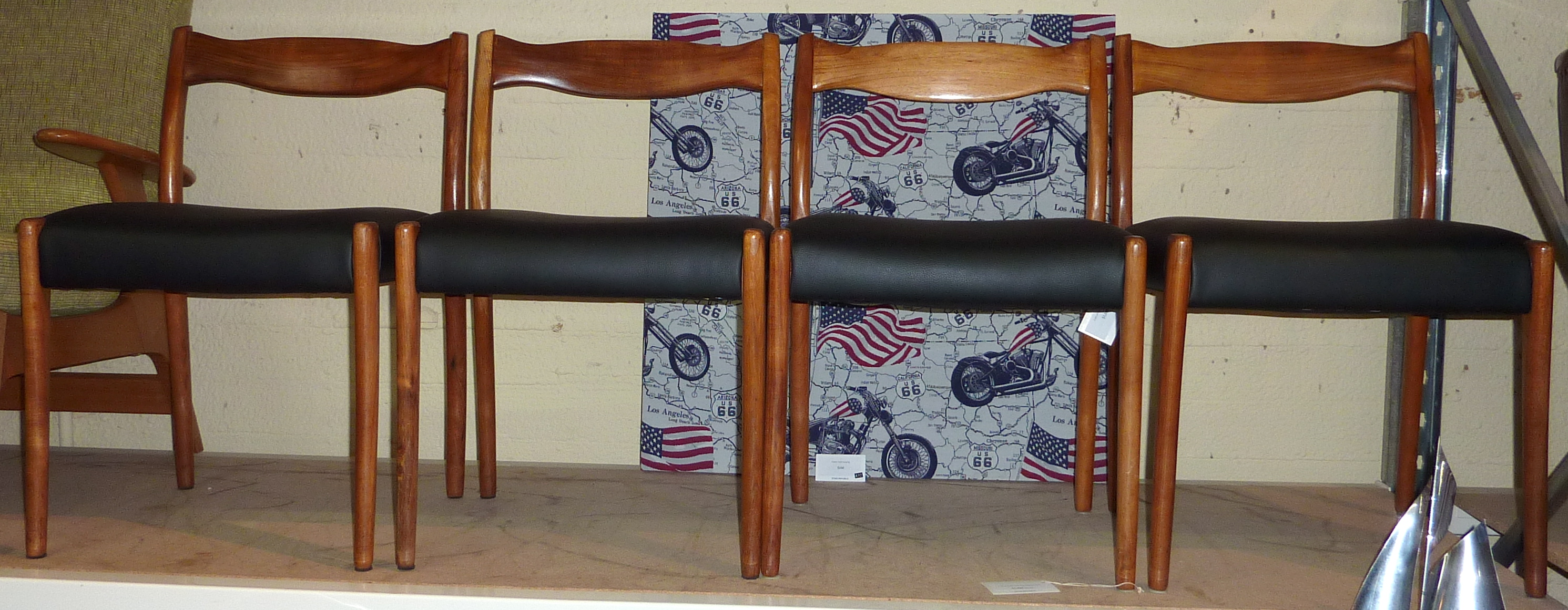
6 FLER No-64 Teak Dining Chairs

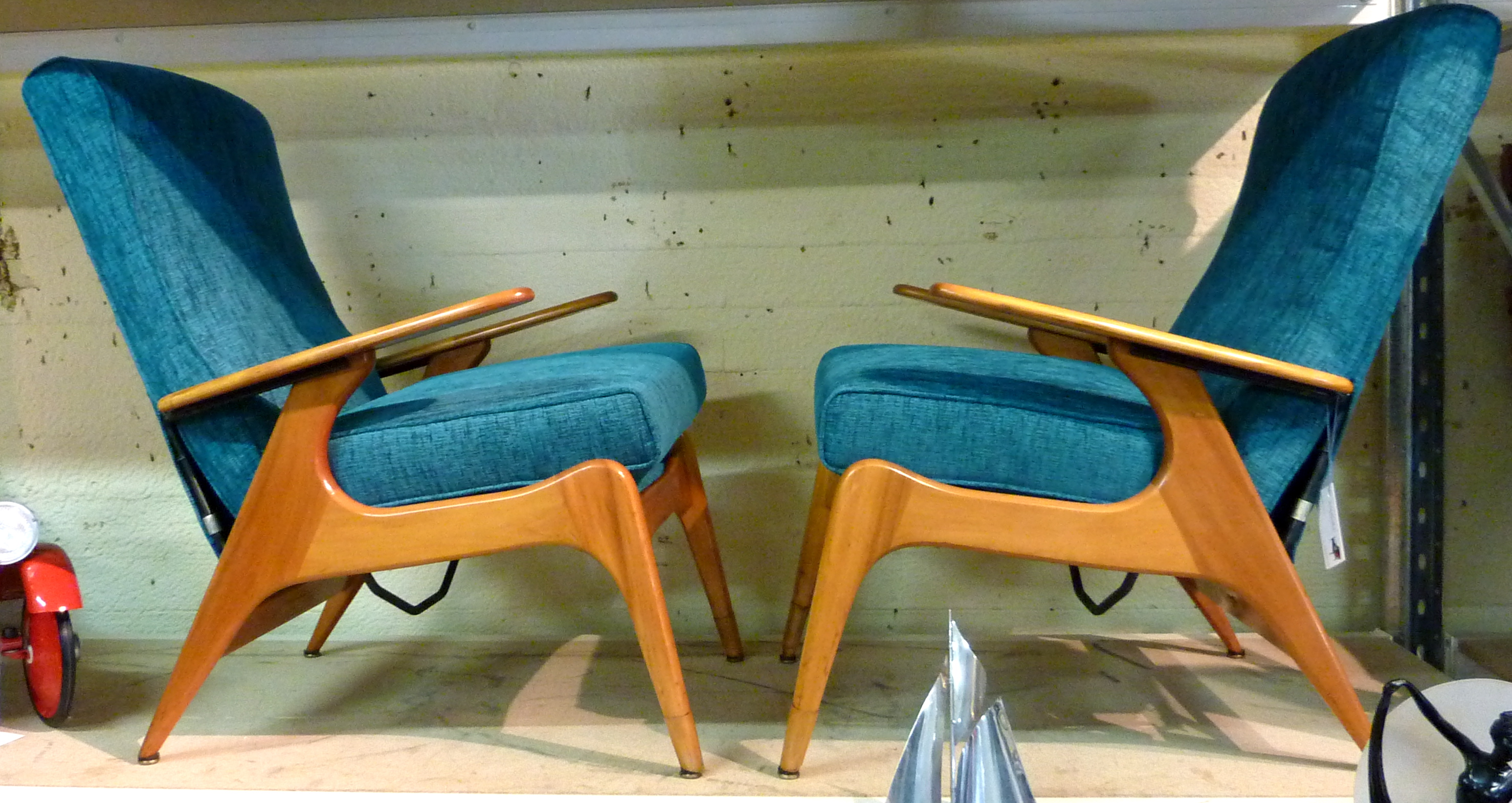
Side view of FLER SC55 armchairs.jpg
