= HMT Dunera =

British passenger ship

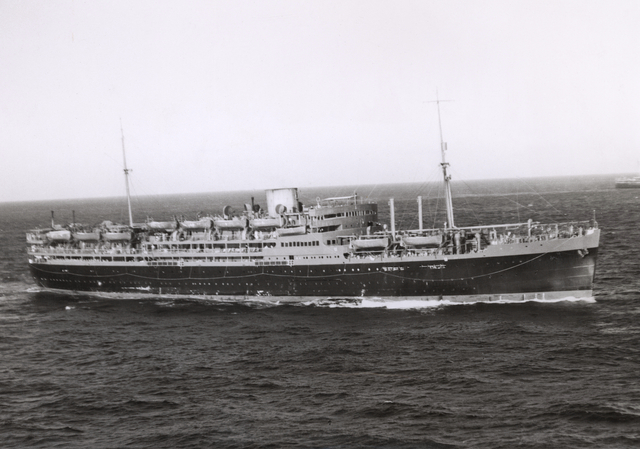
- HMT Dunera in 1940

History

United Kingdom
- Name: Dunera
- Owner: British India Steam Navigation Company
- Port of registry: London, United Kingdom
- Builder: Barclay Curle & Company, Glasgow
- Yard number: 663
- Launched: 10 May 1937
- In service: 25 August 1937
- Out of service: 1967
- Identification: Call sign: GBBR; IMO number: 5094824; Official Number 165552
- Fate: Scrapped 1967, Bilbao

General characteristics
- Class & type: Troopship, educational cruise ship
- Tonnage: 11,161 GRT; 6,634 NRT; 3,819 t DWT
- Length: 516 ft 10 in (157.53 m)
- Beam: 63 ft 3 in (19.28 m)
- Draught: 23 ft 5 in (7.14 m)
- Propulsion: Two 5-cylinder 2SCSA Doxford-type opposed piston oil engines, 11,880 bhp (8,860 kW), twin screws
- Speed: 16 knots (30 km/h; 18 mph)
- Capacity: 104 1st Class, 100 2nd Class & 164 3rd Class passengers
- Troops: 1,157
- Crew: 290

HMT (Hired Military Transport) Dunera was a British passenger ship which, in 1940, became involved in a controversial transportation of thousands of "enemy aliens" to Australia. The British India Steam Navigation Company had operated a previous Dunera (1891), which served as a troopship during the Second Boer War.

== Early service as a troopship ==
After sea trial in 1937, she was handed over to the British India Steam Navigation Company and served as a passenger liner and an educational cruise ship before seeing extensive service as a troopship throughout World War II. She was taken over by the Royal Navy as a troopship before hostilities started, and was taking troops to the Far East when her crew heard the news of war at Malta on 3 September 1939. (Note: From private diary of telegraphist R. H. Wood.) Dunera carried New Zealand troops to Egypt in January 1940.

== Transport voyage to Australia ==
=== Background ===
After Britain declared war on Germany, the government set up aliens tribunals to distinguish Nazi sympathisers from refugees who had fled from Nazism. As a result, 568 were classified as unreliable, 6,800 were left at liberty but subject to restrictions, and 65,000 were regarded as friendly. However, after the fall of France, the loss of the Low Countries and Italy's declaration of war, Britain stood alone against the Axis and anxieties became acute. In what Winston Churchill later regretted as "a deplorable and regrettable mistake", all Austrians and Germans, and many Italians, were suspected of being enemy agents, potentially helping to plan the invasion of Britain, and a decision was made to deport them. Canada agreed to take some of them and Australia others, though, "not since the middle of the nineteenth century had Australia received the unwanted of Britain transported across the world for the purposes of incarceration".

=== Voyage ===
On 10 July 1940, 2,542 detainees, all classified as enemy aliens, were embarked aboard Dunera at Liverpool. While the detainees included 200 Italian and 251 German prisoners of war, as well as several dozen Nazi sympathizers, the majority were 2,036 Italian and German civilians who were anti-Nazi, most of them Jewish refugees. Some had already been to sea but their ship, the SS Arandora Star, had been torpedoed en route to Canada, with great loss of life. In addition to the passengers were 309 poorly trained guards, mostly from the Auxiliary Military Pioneer Corps, as well as seven officers and the ship's crew, creating a total complement of almost twice the Dunera's capacity as a troop carrier of 1,600.

Using the tune of "My Bonnie Lies over the Ocean" learned from their British warders, internees composed and sang "regularly on board the ship", "My luggage went into the ocean, My luggage went into the sea, My luggage was thrown in the ocean, Oh, bring back my luggage to me!" Most internees were kept below decks throughout the voyage, except for daily 10-minute exercise periods, during which internees would walk around the deck under heavy guard; during one such period, a guard smashed beer bottles on the deck so that the internees would have to walk on the shards. In contrast to the Army personnel, the ship's crew and officers showed kindness to the internees, and some later testified at the soldiers' courts-martial.

The ship was an overcrowded Hell-hole. Hammocks almost touched, many men had to sleep on the floor or on tables. There was only one piece of soap for twenty men, and one towel for ten men, water was rationed, and luggage was stowed away so there was no change of clothing. As a consequence, skin diseases were common. There was a hospital on board but no operating theatre. Toilet facilities were far from adequate, even with makeshift latrines erected on the deck and sewage flooded the decks. Dysentery ran through the ship. Blows with rifle butts and beatings from the soldiers were daily occurrences. One refugee tried to go to the latrines on deck during the night – which was out-of-bounds. He was bayoneted in the stomach by one of the guards and spent the rest of the voyage in the hospital.

While passing through the Irish Sea, the Dunera was struck by a torpedo that failed to detonate; a second torpedo passed underneath the vessel, which was lifted out of its path by the rough seas. After the war it was discovered, partly from a German submarine captain's diary, that, on another occasion, the Dunera was saved from being destroyed because of the German-language items tossed overboard, "and picked up ... to inspect" by that captain's divers who concluded that the ship was carrying prisoners of war. (Note: Also Paysach J. Krohn Maggid series, Artscroll.)

=== Arrival and internment ===
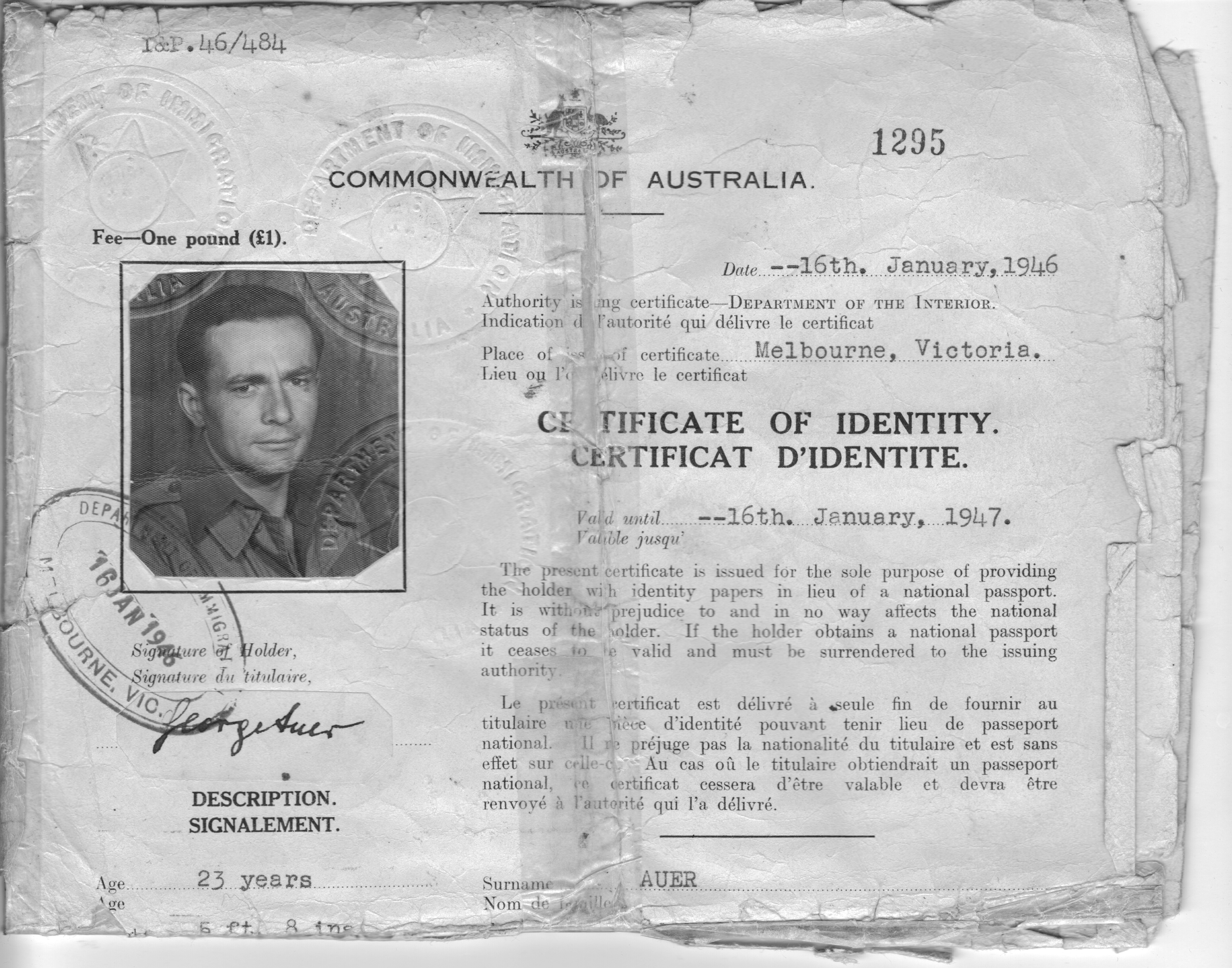
Georg Auer was shipped to Australia on Dunera. He was kept in an internment camp until 1942, when he joined the Australian army. He served until 1946. This document was issued by the Australian Department of the Interior in lieu of a national passport to facilitate the return to Austria.

On arrival in Sydney on 6 September 1940, the first Australian on board was an army medical officer Alan Frost. He was appalled and his subsequent report led to a court martial at Chelsea Barracks, London, in May 1941. The officer in charge, Major William Patrick Scott, was "severely reprimanded" as was Sergeant Arthur Helliwell; RSM Charles Albert Bowles was reduced to the ranks and given a twelve-month prison sentence and then discharged from the British Army. Lieutenant John O'Neill VC was an officer of the Pioneers, who appeared as a witness.

After leaving the Dunera the pale and emaciated refugees were transported through the night by train 750 kilometres (470 mi) west of Sydney to the rural town of Hay in southern New South Wales.

The treatment on the train was in stark contrast to the horrors of the Dunera – the men were given packages of food and fruit, and Australian soldiers offered them cigarettes. There was even one story of a soldier asking one of the internees to hold his rifle while he lit his cigarette.

In Britain relatives had not at first been told what had happened to the internees, but as letters arrived from Australia there was a clamour to have them released and heated exchanges in the House of Commons. Colonel Victor Cazalet, a Conservative MP said, on 22 August 1940:

Frankly I shall not feel happy, either as an Englishman or as a supporter of this government, until this bespattered page of our history has been cleaned up and rewritten.

Churchill reportedly regretted the hasty deportations, especially of those who had been seeking Britain's aid. A fund of £35,000 (equivalent to £1.7 million in 2025) was set up to compensate the Dunera passengers for the loss of their belongings.

While interned in Australia, the internees set up and administered their own township with Hay currency (which is now a valuable collector's item) and an unofficial "university". After the Japanese attack on Pearl Harbor in 1941, the prisoners were reclassified as "friendly aliens" and released by the Australian Government. About a thousand volunteered to join the Australian Military Forces and, having shown themselves to be "dinkum", were offered residency at the end of the war. Almost all the rest made their way back to Britain, many of them joining the armed forces there. Others were recruited as interpreters or into the intelligence services. In 1941, as honorary secretary of the Zionist Federation of Australia and New Zealand, Benzion Patkin organised the migration from Tatura internment camp to Israel of 150 of the refugees; he subsequently published Dunera Internees (1979).

=== Notable transportees ===
Among the transportees on the Dunera were:

- Joseph Asher (1921–1990), rabbi
- Hans Axel, photographer
- Kurt Baier (1917–2010), philosopher
- Giovanni Baldelli (1914–1986), Italian anarchist theorist
- Felix Behrend (1911–1962), mathematician
- Boaz Bischofswerder (1895–1946), rabbi and composer, and his son Felix Werder (1922–2012), composer, critic, educator
- Ulrich Boschwitz (1915–1942), author (pen name John Grane);
- Hans Adolf Buchdahl (1919–2010), theoretical physicist, and his engineer (later philosopher) brother Gerd (1914–2001)
- F. W. Eirich, research scientist
- Paul Eisenklam, engineering professor
- Erwin Fabian (1915–2020), painter and sculptor
- Hans Frankmann, (1897-1978), born Vienna, doctor of Engineering, returned to England July 1941
- Walter Freud, grandson of Sigmund Freud
- Helmut Gernsheim, photographer, returned to England in 1942
- Alexander Gordon, born Abrascha Gorbulski (1922–2011); Kindertransport from Hamburg, Germany, to England, 14 December 1938; served in the British Army, 1941–1948; appeared in the Academy Award-winning documentary Into the Arms of Strangers
- Fred Gruen, economist
- Heinz Henghes (1906–1975), sculptor
- Peter Herbst (1919–2007), Chair of Philosophy, Australian National University 1962–1984.
- Ludwig Hirschfeld-Mack (1893–1965), artist
- Robert Hofmann (1889–1987), Austrian painter, naturalised Australian, moved to Syracuse, New York, in 1956
- Walter Kaufmann, writer
- Wolf Klaphake, the inventor of synthetic camphor
- Ernst Kitzinger, art historian
- Johannes Matthaeus Koelz / John Matthew Kelts, artist
- Hans Kronberger, nuclear physicist
- Erich Liffmann, tenor
- Martin Löb, mathematician
- Fred Lowen (born Fritz Karl Heinz Lowenstein) and Ernst Roedeck, furniture design partners
- Ray Martin (born Kurt Kohn), composer
- Henry Mayer, author and professor of politics at the University of Sydney
- Hans Joseph Meyer, teacher at Bunce Court School in Kent
- Max-Peter Meyer (1892–1950), German Jewish-born composer, married a Catholic and converted, of the London College of Music where he returned after the war and became a fellow (Mass in D minor, Dunera Mass, performed in Hay on 6 May 1941)
- Majer Ivan Pietruschka, Polish-born conductor and violinist, joined the Melbourne Symphony Orchestra
- Rainer Radok, German-born Jew, Professor at Brooklyn Polytechnic Institute, University of Adelaide, Flinders University (Adelaide), Asian Institute of Technology (Bangkok)
- Anton Ruh, German resistance member and diplomat
- Richard Sonnenfeldt, German-born Jew, chief interpreter for the American prosecution at the post-war Nuremberg trials
- Peter Stadlen, Austrian-born pianist and musicologist; returned to Britain
- Franz Stampfl, later the athletics coach to the four-minute-mile runner Roger Bannister
- Bert Stern, the father of economist Nicholas Stern, Baron Stern of Brentford who travelled to Hay to see the camp
- Henry Talbot, fashion photographer
- Wilhelm Unger, writer
- Count Oswald "Ossie" Veit von Wolfenstein and his brother Christopher, whose Austrian Catholic family was sponsored by Arnold J. Toynbee when they fled to Britain It was Oswald Wolkenstein who kept and then passed on the score in 2002 of Meyer's Dunera Mass.
- Hugo Wolfsohn, political scientist

=== Legacy ===
The 1985 Australian mini series The Dunera Boys depicts the events.

The 2001 Oscar-winning documentary, Into the Arms of Strangers: Stories of the Kindertransport, features an interview with Dunera and Kindertransport survivor, Alexander Gordon.

Nothing remains of Hay internment camp except a road called Dunera Way and a memorial stone which reads:

This plaque marks the 50th anniversary of the arrival from England of 1,984 refugees from Nazi oppression, mistakenly shipped out on HMT Dunera and interned in Camps 7 & 8 on this site from 7. 9. 1940 to 20. 5. 1941. Many joined the AMF on their release from internment and made Australia their homeland and greatly contributed to its development. Donated by the Shire of Hay – September 1990.

In 2024, the State Library of New South Wales in Sydney presented an exhibition of over 200 artworks created by Dunera internees.

== Later service as a troopship ==
HMT Dunera's next notable services were the Madagascar operations in September 1942, the Allied invasion of Sicily in July 1943, and in September 1944 she carried the headquarters staff for the US 7th Army for the invasion of southern France. After the Japanese surrender in 1945, Dunera transported occupation forces to Japan. She was later employed to transport troops to and from the Suez Canal Zone.

== Post-war career ==
In 1950/1951, Dunera was refitted by Barclay, Curle to improve her to postwar troopship specifications: her capacity was now 123 First Class, 95 Second Class, 100 Third Class and 831 troops; tonnages now 12,615 gross, 7,563 net and 3,675 tons deadweight.

The Ministry of Defence terminated Dunera's trooping charter in 1960 and she was refitted by Palmers Shipbuilding and Iron Company at Hebburn-on-Tyne in early 1961 for the British India Steam Navigation Company in her new role as an educational cruise ship. (Note: Educational Cruises were operated by the British India Steam Navigation Company in the 1960s and 1970s, to take school children from British colonies and member countries of the Commonwealth on educational tours in European waters, lasting usually a fortnight.) New facilities (classrooms, swimming pool, games rooms, library and assembly rooms) were introduced. Her capacity became 187 cabin passengers and 834 children; 12,620 GRT, 7,430 NRT. Tam Dalyell, who later went on to become member of parliament for West Lothian, was director of studies on the ship between 1961 and 1962.

The Dunera was subsequently a cruise ship until November 1967, when it was sold to Revalorizacion de Materiales SA, and scrapped at Bilbao.

== See also ==
- Hay Internment and POW camps – Camps in New South Wales, Australia
