= Wilhelm Unger =

German author, journalist and theatre critic

- Born: June 4, 1904; Hohensalza, Prussian Province of Posen, German Empire
- Died: December 19, 1985 (aged 81); Cologne, West Germany
- Occupations: Writer, journalist, theatre critic
- Relatives: Alfred H. Unger (older brother)
- Writing career
- Language: German
- Notable works: Beethovens Vermächtnis (1929); The Goethe-Year: 1749-1949 (1952)

Wilhelm Unger (4 June 1904 – 19 December 1985) was a German writer, journalist and theatre critic.

He was also the younger brother of the writer and dramaturge Alfred H. Unger.

== Life ==
Wilhelm Unger was born in Hohensalza (today called Inowrocław), at that time a small industrial town in the Prussian Province of Posen which since 1945 has been in the centre of Poland. His father, Samuel Unger, was a Jewish physician originally from Cologne. His mother, Flora Unger, had been born in Russia. In 1907, when he was just 3, the family moved back to Cologne which is where Unger completed his schooling and an apprenticeship in publishing and the book trade. He then moved on to study Germanistics, Philosophy and Psychology at Cologne and nearby Bonn.

After this he worked for the newspaper Kölnische Zeitung and for the West German Radio (WDR) service which had relaunched and relocated to Cologne from Münster in 1926. His first book, "Beethovens Vermächtnis" ("Beethoven's Legacy") was published in 1929 but fell victim to government book burnings in 1933.

The Nazi take-over in January 1933 ushered in twelve years during which antisemitism quickly became an integral underpinning of government strategy. As professional opportunities were closed off and racist street violence increased, many Jews fled abroad. The Unger family, initially, stayed in Germany. However, on 15 March 1939, as news services reported the German military invasion of Czechoslovakia, Wilhelm Unger fled to England, where his brother had been living since 1937. Their two sisters, Ella and Grete, would be murdered in concentration camps. The brothers discovered only in 1945 that their parents had outlived the Nazi regime, held in the Theresienstadt concentration camp.

War across Europe broke out more generally during September 1939 and at the end of June 1940 the German air force launched a series of large scale nightly air attacks on English and Welsh cities. The British authorities now responded by suddenly identifying thousands of refugees from political and/or race based persecution in Nazi Germany as enemy aliens whom they arrested and locked up. Wilhelm Unger was arrested on 1 July 1940 in London and selected for transportation to Melbourne, Australia on board HMT Dunera which set sail from Liverpool on 10 July, carrying between 2,000 and 3,000 foreigners (sources differ) who had been classified as enemy aliens, looked after by 309 poorly trained guards. The voyage was not well planned or managed and the internees suffered serious abuse from their British guards. Wilhelm Unger still had with him the manuscript entitled "Cosmic Psychology" which he had rescued when he fled Germany, intending to have it published in London, for which arrangements had already been made; but during the voyage the manuscript was confiscated by one of the British guards and thrown overboard.

Several of his Jewish fellow internees broke down because of the bad treatment and committed suicide. However, by the end of that summer reports of the atrocities had reached the British parliament and the authorities slowly began to rethink their policy of locking up the political and racially selected refugees from Nazi Germany. After intervention on his behalf by PEN International Wilhelm Unger was released and shipped back from Australia. Following another eventful voyage, on his arrival in Liverpool on 7 December 1941, in his own words, "I received the news about Pearl Harbor. The Japanese/American war had begun ... That meant that the war would not be over any time soon". He spent the next few years in London where there are indications that till the end of the war he worked for the "Culture Department" of the BBC.

In October 1947 he visited Germany on behalf of the British military administration and attended the First German Writers' Congress, which was held in Berlin (where the city's political and administrative divisions were not yet replicated by the physical barriers that would appear during the next four or five years). He arrived with a mandate from PEN International to identify twenty German authors of international repute, untainted by the nation's recent history, able to found a new German PEN centre. He was deeply shocked to see the extent of the destruction of the German cities and by the "inner emptiness of the war generation".

It was not till 1956 that Wilhelm Unger returned to live in Cologne, where he worked for the feuilleton supplement of the Kölner Stadt-Anzeiger (daily newspaper), also making contributions on WDR and on the international radio service Deutsche Welle, as national broadcasting in West Germany became increasingly focused on Cologne. He also wrote for the precursor to the Jüdische Allgemeine weekly news magazine. As a commentator and theatre critic he used his influence to encourage young director-impresarios such as his friends Peter Zadek and Jürgen Flimm.

Unger was a co-founder of the Cologne Association for Christian-Jewish Collaboration (1958) and of the Germania Judaica library (1959), together with Heinrich Böll and Paul Schallück.

He died in Cologne on 19 December 1985.

== Output (selection) ==
- Beethovens Vermächtnis, Sieger-Verlag, Köln, 1929.
- Taschen-Lexikon der Astrologie, Theodor Hoock Verlag, Köln, 1934.
- The Goethe-Year: 1749-1949, Maxson & Co., London 1952.
- Zur Weihe der wiederhergestellten Synagoge Roonstrasse und des jüdischen Kulturzentrums in Köln, Synagogen-Gemeinde, Köln 1959.
- Wofür ist das ein Zeichen? Auswahl aus veröffentlichten und unveröffentlichten Werken des Kritikers und Autors. Hrsg. von Meret Meyer. DuMont, Köln 1984. ISBN 3-7701-1635-6
