= Giovanni Baldelli =

Italian anarchist (1914–1986)

Giovanni Baldelli (1914–1986) was an Italian anarchist theorist, best known for his 1971 work Social Anarchism which defines social anarchism and provides a framework for its introduction.

== Early life ==
Baldelli was born in Milan on 22 May 1914 to Luigi and Josephine Baldelli. He left school at age 15 and became a manual laborer.

== Political activity ==
Because he was being noticed for his political activity, Baldelli's father arranged for him to go to France in 1929 on the pretense that he was there to study. He continued his political activity there, and returned to Italy in 1932 only to be arrested for his political activity and imprisoned for nine months. On his release he moved to England where he wrote for Solidaritie Internationale anti-Fasciste (SIA) from 1938 to 1940. In 1940 he was again deported for his political views. He was originally placed on a ship with other deportees destined for Canada, but the ship (Arandora Star)was attacked by a Uboat near Scotland; Baldelli was one of the few survivors. He was then sent to prison in Australia on the HMT Dunera. He returned to England in 1945 where he received degrees from the University of London: B.A. General, 1947, B.A. Honours, 1948. In 1958 he presided over the International Anarchist Congress in London.

== Writing ==
Baldelli is best known for Social Anarchism, his book on theory of social anarchism first published in 1971. He discusses the ethical underpinnings of anarchism, discusses its methods, and illustrates his vision of an ethical anarchist society.

While known primarily for his treatise on social anarchism, Baldelli also wrote poetry, plays and philosophical works. Published poetry includes the collections Quand l'aube se survit (1965), Chair à étoiles(1999), Proses et poèmes and Le pied à l’étrier, all in French; Itinerario and All'ombra del gufo (1953), both in Italian; and Seven Fugues(1956), in English. He also wrote plays (unpublished).

== Personal life ==
He moved to Southampton in 1962, where he taught at St. Olave's Grammar School. Shortly thereafter he had his theatrical work, Triangle in Red, presented at the Hovenden Theatre in London. He died in Southampton on November 11 1986.

He married Evelyn May Field in 1947; they divorced in 1960. He married Hilda Bridge in 1972. They had two children: Giovanna and Benvenuto.

== Publications ==
=== Political writings ===
- Baldelli, Giovanni (1971). Social anarchism (1st ed.). New Brunswick [N.J.]: AldineTransaction. ISBN 978-0-202-36339-4.
- Baldelli, Giovanni (1972). "Review of The Anarchist Prince: A Biographical Study". The American Political Science Review. 66 (4): 1398–1399. doi:10.2307/1957236. ISSN 0003-0554. JSTOR 1957236. S2CID 147023942.

=== Poetry ===
- Baldelli, Giovanni (1956). Seven fugues. London: Fortune Press.
- Baldelli, Giovanni (1965). Quand l'aube se survit : poèmes. Rodez: Éditions Subervie.
- Baldelli, Giovanni (1975). Proses et poèmes : poésie (Édition originale ed.). Paris: Éditions de l'Athanor.
- Baldelli, Giovanni (1969). La pied a l'étrier : poèmes. Rodez: Éditions Subervie.
- Baldelli, Giovanni (1973). Itinerario. Piccola Fenice. Parma: Guanda.
- Baldelli, Giovanni (1999). Chair à étoiles. Collection "Infini". Clermont-l'Hérault: Ateliers de la Licorne. ISBN 978-2-912670-07-6.
