= J. Allan Cash =

English photographer (1902–1974)

James Allan Johnstone Cash, F.R.P.S, F.I.B.P (1902 in Bucklow, Cheshire – 14 February 1974)

== Biography ==
Cash was a radio engineer before becoming a photographer and writer. At age 23, he moved to Canada to work for the Northern Electric Company's broadcasting station. Cash travelled throughout the 1930s, taking photographs with his Leica camera. He married Betty, another photographer and traveller, in 1939 and together they owned a gallery in Camden Town which specialised in travel photographs.

== Photography ==
Cash's photographic endeavours lead him to found the Hampstead Photographic Society in 1937 and from 1944 to 1945 was its president. He then served as a photographer in the army during World War II. In the 1960s, he became a founding member of the British Guild of Travel Writers along with Anthony F. Kersting who he collaborated with on a book of photographs.

An exhibition of his photographs 'Camera Globe Trotter' toured the UK in 1975-6, starting at the Society House of the Royal Photographic Society, and visiting Woburn Abbey and The Grand Hotel, Brighton.

== Honours ==
- Fellow of the Institute of British Photography.
- Fellow of the Royal Photographic Society.

== Other information ==
Photographs contributed by James Allan Cash to the Conway Library are currently being digitised by the Courtauld Institute of Art, as part of the Courtauld Connects project.

== Bibliography ==
- Photography with a Leica, J. A. Cash, London; Fountain Press, 1955.
- African Voyage, J. A. Cash, London; Fountain Press, 1955.
- The English Countryside in Colour. A collection of colour photographs by J. A. Cash and A. F. Kersting. London: B. T. Batsford, 1957.
- Camera Globetrotter, J. A. Cash, London; Fountain Press, 1973.
- History, People and Places in the Cotswolds, J. A. Cash, Bourne End; Spurbooks, 1974.
