= Hohenbrunn =

- Municipality
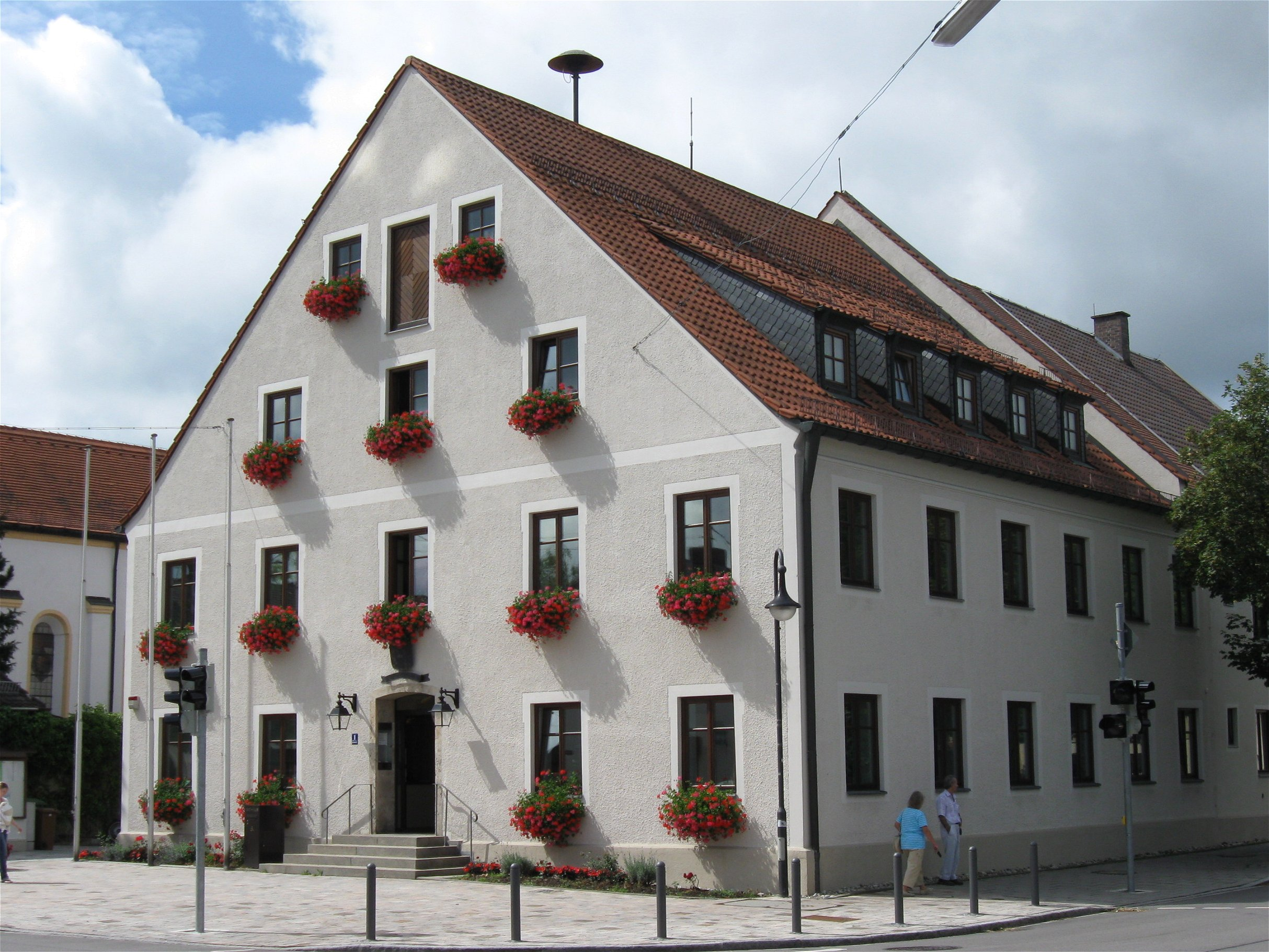
- Town hall

- Coat of arms

- Location of Hohenbrunn within Munich district
- Interactive map of Hohenbrunn
- Location within Germany Location within Bavaria
- Coordinates: 48°3′N 11°42′E
- Country: Germany
- State: Bavaria
- Admin. region: Upper Bavaria
- District: Munich

Government
  - Mayor (2020–26): Stefan Straßmair (CSU)

Area
  - Total: 18.58 km^{2} (7.17 sq mi)
- Elevation: 568 m (1,864 ft)

Population (2025-12-31)
  - Total: 8,951
  - Density: 481.8/km^{2} (1,248/sq mi)
- Time zone: UTC+01:00 (CET)
  - Summer (DST): UTC+02:00 (CEST)
- Postal codes: 85662, 85521
- Dialling codes: 08102, 089
- Vehicle registration: M
- Website: www.hohenbrunn.de

Hohenbrunn (German pronunciation: [ˈhoːənbʁʊn]) is a municipality in the district of Munich in Bavaria, Germany.

It is located in the southeast of Munich, occupying an area of 16.82 km². It connects to the Bundesautobahn 99 with its own exit, BAS Hohenbrunn. As of 30 June 2014, the population was 8,726.

== History ==
Early settlements existed around springs from 500 to 800 AD. The first written remark about Hohenbrunn is dated to the year 780 AD by Tassilo III of Bavaria.

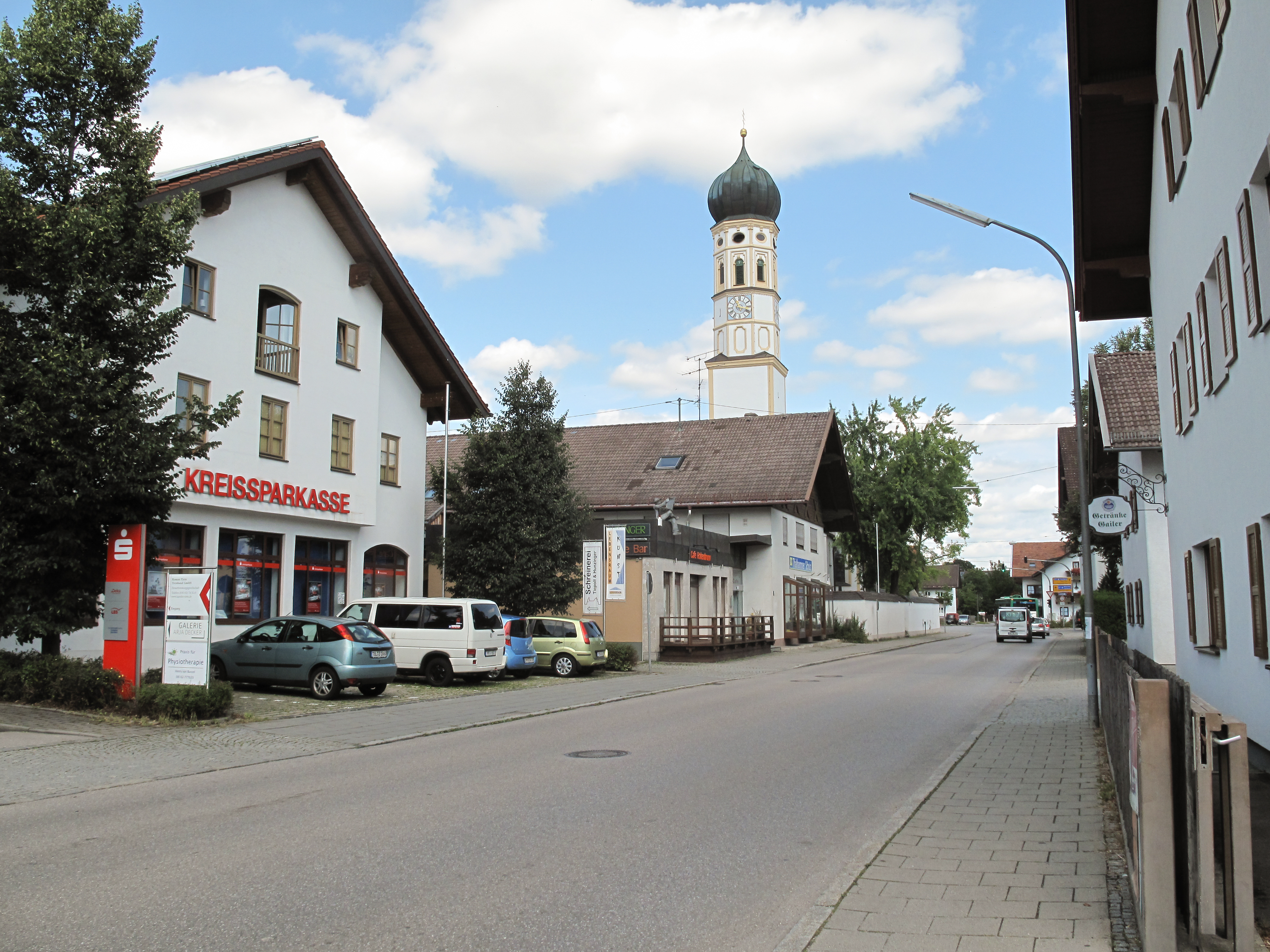
Hohenbrun, churchtower in the street
