= Baldelli ceramics =

Baldelli ceramics have been made by Ceramiche Baldelli in Città di Castello, near Perugia, Italy, since 1943.

The Baldelli family have been making ceramics for four generations. Ceramist Dante Baldelli (1904-1953), a ceramist working since the 1920s, who became the director of Ceramica Rometti di Umbertide, opened his own workshop in 1943, in piazza Gioberti, Città di Castello, accompanied by his brother Angelo and gradually assisted by his oldest son Massimo, who was eight at the time but who took over the business at the unexpected death of his father in 1953, aged eighteen; under his leadership production was being sold in US department stores from the 1970s.

During the 1980s, Massimo Baldelli's daughter Simona and her husband Lorenzo Colacicchi joined the family business.

In the early 1990s the Baldelli studio resited to the country outside Città di Castello.

== See also ==
- List of Italian companies
