= Hay Internment and POW camps =

Camps in New South Wales, Australia

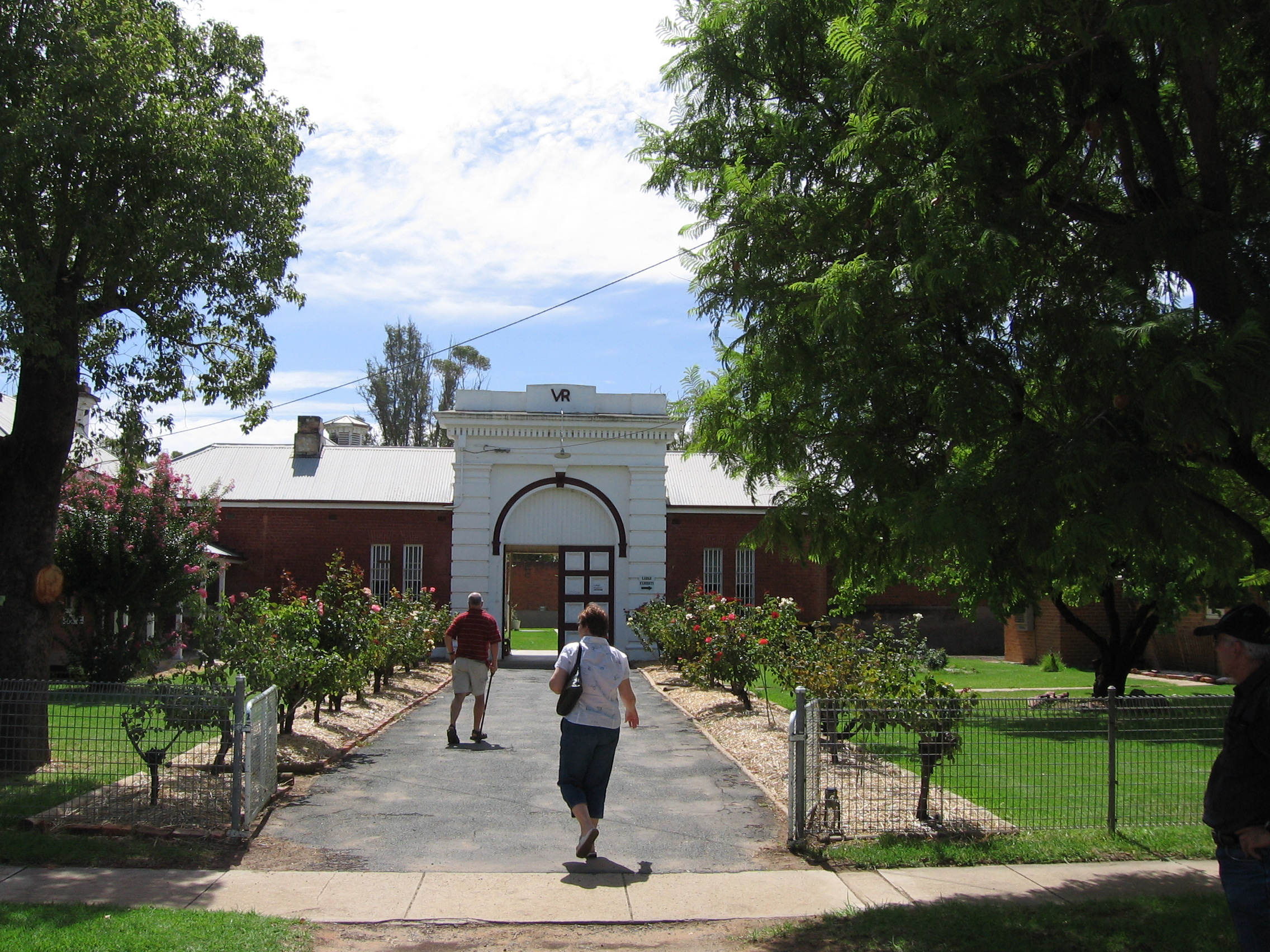
Hay Gaol is today a museum with displays detailing its varied history as a prison, POW camp and girls institution.

The Hay Internment and POW camps at Hay, New South Wales, Australia were established during World War II as prisoner-of-war and internment centres, due in part to the isolated location of the town. Three high-security camps were constructed in 1940. The first arrivals were 2,542 internees from Nazi Germany and Austria, most of whom were Jewish; they had been interned in the United Kingdom as enemy aliens when the possibility of an Axis invasion of Britain was at its highest.

These internees were transported to Australia on board the British passenger ship HMT Dunera. The internees were kept in poor conditions on Dunera, which prompted a public outcry after news of their conditions became public. The internees arrived at Hay on 7 September 1940 by four trains from Sydney. They were interned in Camps 7 and 8 (located near the Hay showground) under the guard of the 16th Garrison Battalion of the Australian Army. In November 1940 the other compound at Hay, Camp 6 (near the Hay Hospital), was occupied by Italian civilian internees. Camps 7 and 8 were vacated in May 1941 when the Dunera internees left Hay; some were sent to Orange (NSW), others to Tatura in Victoria, and others to join the Pioneer Corps of the Australian Army.

After the Dunera internees departed, Italian prisoners of war were placed in Camps 7 and 8. In December 1941, Japanese internees (some from Broome and from islands north of Australia) were conveyed to Hay and placed in Camp 6. In April 1942 the River Farm began operating on the eastern edge of the township, enabling market gardening and other farm activities to be carried out by the Italian internees and POWs. In February 1945, in the wake of the Cowra POW break-out, a large number of Japanese POWs were transferred to Hay and placed in the three high-security compounds. On 1 March 1946 the Japanese POWs departed from Hay in five trains, and were transferred to Tatura. During 1946 the Italians who remained at Hay were progressively released or transferred to other camps. The Hay camps were dismantled and building materials and fittings sold off by June the following year. Hay Military Post Office was open from 4 December 1940 until 29 June 1946, defining the main period of use of the facility.

The first group of internees at Hay became known as the ‘Dunera Boys’. The internment at Hay of this assemblage of refugees from Nazi oppression in Europe was an important milestone in Australia’s cultural history. Just under half of those interned at Hay eventually chose to remain in Australia. The influence of this group of men on subsequent cultural, scientific and business developments in Australia is difficult to overstate: they became an integral and celebrated part of the nation’s cultural and intellectual life. The 'Dunera Boys' are still fondly remembered in Hay: every year the town holds a 'Dunera Day' in which many surviving internees return to the site of their former imprisonment. Of the 900 'Dunera Boys' who remained in Australia after being sent to the camp, approximately 50 survived into 2010.

== Reception ==
- The Dunera Boys - 1985 Australian mini-series
- To My Brave Wife: Dunera notes from a Jewish 'enemy alien' - 2011 book by Dr Kurt Epstein who discusses the psychological and physical realities.

== See also ==
- HMT Dunera
