= Karl Loewenstein (banker) =

German naval officer and businessman (1887–1976)

- Born: Karl Loewenstein; 2 May 1887; Siegen, Prussia, German Empire
- Died: 9 August 1975/1976; Bad Neuenahr-Ahrweiler, Rhineland-Palatinate, West Germany
- Other name: Karl Loesten
- Occupation: Banker
- Political party: German People's Party (1918–1933); Fatherland Party (1917–1918)
- Spouse: Margot Hamburger

Karl Loewenstein (2 May 1887 – 9 August 1975/1976) was a German banker and naval officer. He was imprisoned in the Theresienstadt Ghetto in the Protectorate of Bohemia and Moravia during World War II. In the ghetto, he served as the head of the Jewish police. After World War II, Loewenstein was rearrested and imprisoned without charge for a period of time by authorities of the reconstituted Czechoslovakia, purportedly due to mistaken identity.

Though a controversial figure owing to his role in the ghetto hierarchy, historian H. G. Adler – another Theresienstadt internee – later credited Loewenstein's discipline and management as bringing "boons to the camp" and stated that his eventual removal from his post led to "misfortune" for the ghetto's inmates.

== Early life and education ==
Karl Loewenstein was born on 2 May 1887 in Siegen, Germany, to Jewish parents. According to Loewenstein, he studied economics, eventually earning a Ph.D. in the subject. (Note: Loewnstein's education can neither be proved nor disproved independent of his statements as the relevant records were destroyed during World War II. H.G. Adler, who knew Loewenstein, refers to him as "Dr. Loewenstein" throughout his work Theresienstadt 1941–1945.) During World War I he served as an officer in the Imperial German Navy. In 1919, following his discharge, Loewenstein left Judaism and was accepted into the Lutheran Church. In the interwar period, Loewenstein worked as a banker, eventually becoming a director of the Berlin-based Busse and Co.

=== Politics ===
Loewenstein began his political life as a member of the conservative-nationalist Fatherland Party before joining the German People's Party after World War I. During the ascendancy of the Nazi Party, he expressed concerns about increasing animosity towards Germany's Jewish veterans and, in the 1930s, helped establish a parish of the Confessing Church, organized in opposition to Nazi plans to unify all of Germany's Protestant churches into a single, national church.

== Arrest and internments ==
=== Minsk Ghetto ===
Loewenstein's involvement in the Confessing Church, in combination with his Jewish parentage, led to his arrest in November 1941. He was deported from Germany to the Minsk Ghetto. There, he served in the Minsk Ghetto Police. The following year, he was transferred to the Theresienstadt Ghetto in the Protectorate of Bohemia and Moravia.

=== Theresienstadt Ghetto ===
In September 1942, Loewenstein – due to his military experience and German language fluency – was appointed by SS-Hauptsturmführer Siegfried Seidl to organize and lead the Theresienstadt Ghetto's security service, the so-called "Ghetto Guard", making him the second-highest ranking inmate after the Elder of the Jews Jakob Edelstein. A previous iteration of the Ghetto Guard had been deported by German authorities after it was discovered guards were in contact with the outside world via sympathetic cetniks of the Protectorate Gendarmerie.

Unlike in other concentration camps, Loewenstein's Ghetto Guard was not used to support SS deportation operations. Nonetheless, Loewenstein took a hard line against theft and graft; the ghetto was notoriously corrupt due, in part, to political competition between Czech Zionists, Czech assimilationists, and non-Czech internees. Loewenstein said his intent was to ensure the ghetto's limited resources be allocated fairly among the ghetto's residents. This earned him ire among some of those held in Theresienstadt, including ghetto functionary Karl Schliesser. H.G. Adler would later denounce Schliesser of being the "center of corruption in the camp". Adler accused Schliesser of using his role in supplies acquisition – he was one of a few ghetto internees permitted to make periodic trips to Prague to purchase supplies – to make himself one of "the most influential men" at Theresienstadt.

During the year he spent at its head, the Ghetto Guard under Loewenstein swelled to an efficient unit of between 400 and 500 inmates. Loewenstein introduced uniforms, marching drills, and Prussian-inspired military customs for the force. However, the increasing professionalism of the Ghetto Guard created unease with Seidl's successor as the ghetto's SS commander. He became concerned about the presence of a large and well-disciplined Jewish paramilitary force operating in the Protectorate. In 1943, Loewenstein was deposed as head of ghetto security services and much of the Ghetto Guard deported, along with Jakob Edelstein, replaced by yet another inmate-staffed security service. Loewenstein was arrested on orders of the ghetto's new elders, tried, and convicted of several minor offenses by the ghetto court, serving several months' imprisonment in a ghetto jail before his release.

While Loewenstein's service as head of the Theresienstadt Ghetto's Jewish security services was controversial among some Holocaust survivors, he was redeemed by H.G. Adler who, writing in the foreword to his 1955 work Theresienstadt 1941–1945, recalled that:

Even if some may find it disagreeable, it remains a fact that, for a year, Loewenstein – with his great virtues and obvious faults – was a decisive force in shaping the camp's history. To ignore this would be a gross distortion of the truth; because Loewenstein has been treated quite unfairly in the past, there is all the more reason to emphasize his historical significance here and so try to strip away some of this injustice.

Adler would also recall that Loewenstein's "achievements brought many boons to the camp, and his downfall only misfortune".

=== Pankrác Prison ===
Following the liberation of Theresienstadt by the Soviet Union, Loewenstein was almost immediately arrested and held without charge for two years at various sites, including Pankrác Prison. According to Loewenstein, he was arrested because he was suspected of being a German collaborator, as he did not speak Czech. Loewenstein also reported secondhand information that, at his trial for crimes against humanity, Siegfried Seidl disavowed that Loewenstein had ever acted against Jewish interests during the period Seidl knew him. Loewenstein went on to recall that his cellmates at Pankrác Prison included a man whom the authorities suspected of being a Gestapo inspector and was tortured daily to secure a confession, though the man in question later turned out to have been a different person entirely.

Loewenstein was suddenly released in 1947 after a magistrate determined there was no evidence to hold him. According to Loewenstein, "when I was released the Czechs provided me with all kinds of support. They even offered me a pension if I wanted to stay in the Republic".

== Later years ==
Loewenstein emigrated to Great Britain and then on to Australia, where he lived for several years, before returning to Germany where he was eventually awarded a restitution payment by the Federal Republic of Germany. Due to his polarizing status within the community of Holocaust survivors, he changed his name to Karl Loesten. He lived in Berlin in his last years and died in Bad Neuenahr-Ahrweiler in 1975 or 1976.

== Personal life ==
Loewenstein was married to Margot Hamburger and had at least two sons. He is briefly referenced in Tom Lampert's One Life, an account of eight semi-fictional, composite persons from World War II created from the author's documentary research. According to Lampert, Loewenstein was "cultivated, polite, punctilious, and rigorously military".
