= Erich Liffmann =

German-Australian singer

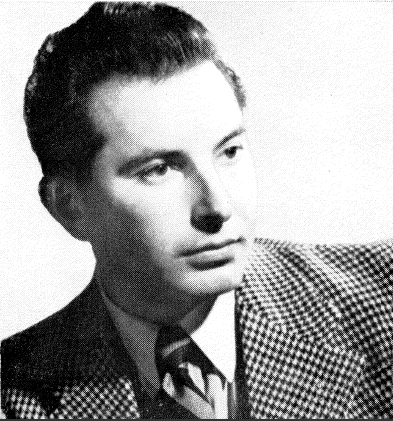
Erich Liffmann

Erich Liffmann (born 22 September 1914 Herrath, Germany, died 11 June 1987 Elwood, Victoria, Australia) was a classically trained musician.

== Germany ==
Liffman began his working career as a sign writer in Germany. He was "discovered" when overheard singing in a shop window by Erwin Palm, then a conductor of the Darmstadt National Opera, who beckoned him to come out into the street by saying "Do you mean to tell me, with a voice like that, you are working as a window dresser?"

He received subsequent training with the oratorio singer Ruth Kisch-Arndt.

== England ==
Because of his Jewish background he decided to escape from Nazi Germany and flee to England in 1939 by obtaining a trainee permit. Unfortunately, he lacked a Work Permit and, despite a contract with Gaumont British, was prevented from working by the British Musicians Union.

At the start of the Second World War he was classified as an "enemy alien". Nine months later, he was rounded up with 2,500, mainly Jewish, enemy aliens and deported to Canada. Due to submarine activity his ship, the HMT Dunera, was diverted to Australia. During this eight-week voyage, he and his refugee colleagues were herded into cramped, filthy conditions and were subjected to significant ill treatment from their guards.

== Australia ==
From September 1940 until May 1941, he and his colleagues were interned in two separate, hot dusty compounds located in Hay, New South Wales. The British Government had managed to round up a significant collection of intellectuals, artists, musicians, designers, craftsmen and chefs. As such, Camp 8 was quickly transformed into an open university, where he devoted more time to his musical studies and participated in shows such as a rewritten version of Snow White, where he played Prince Charming.

After Pearl Harbor, the Australian Government viewed the "Dunera Boys" as a potential work force and he was transferred to pick fruit in Tatura, Victoria, where he subsequently, and somewhat ironically, joined the 8th Employment Company of the Australian Army as Private Eric Liffman. The 8th Employment Company was set up to specifically employ five hundred former Dunera internees.

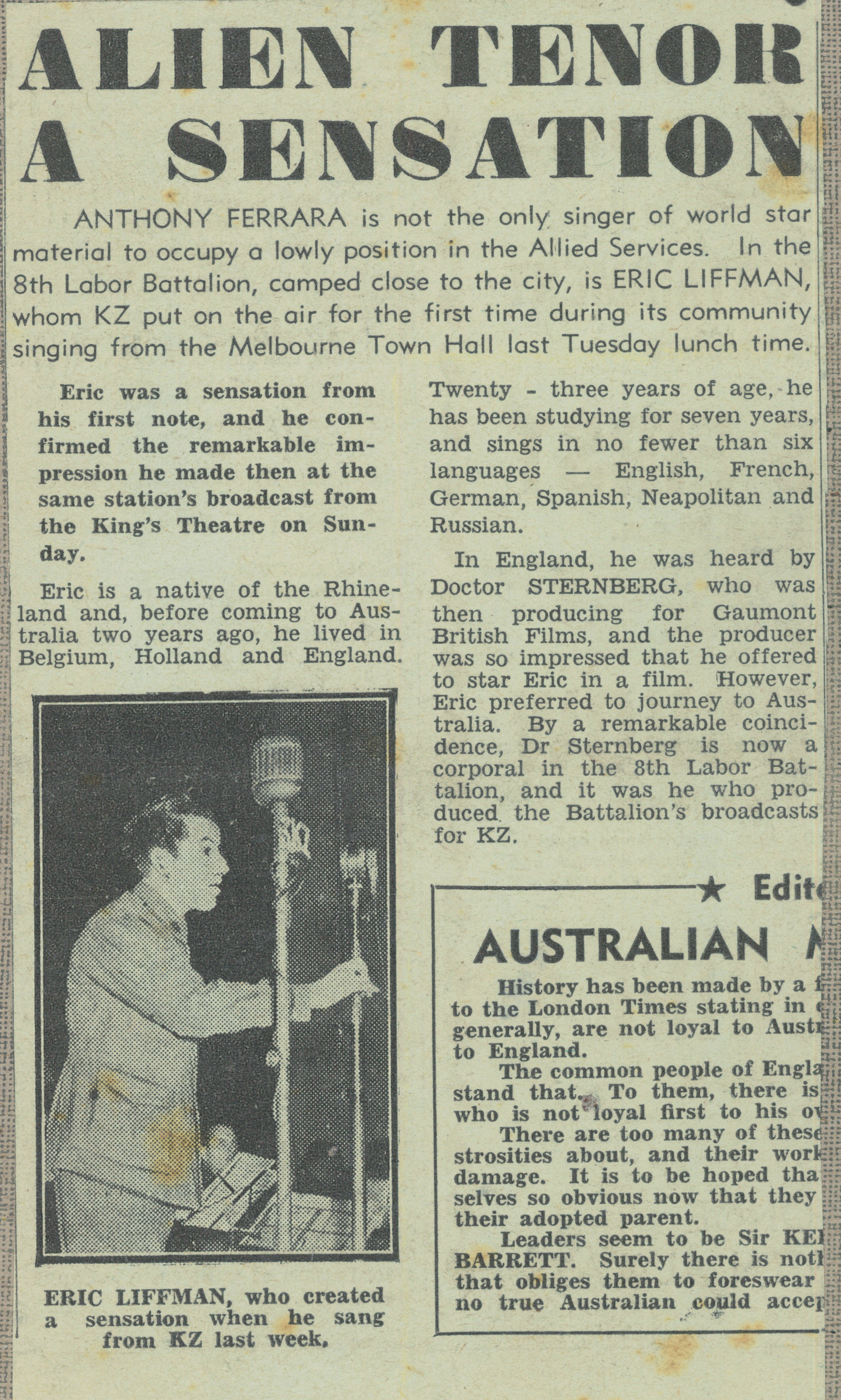
"Radio Times" article describing the discovery of the tenor singer Eric Liffman, May 17–23, 1942. Note that the article is in error regarding the singer's age: he was twenty seven years of age at the time of the concert.

Six weeks after enlisting in the Australian Army, he became an "overnight singing sensation" following two broadcasts from the Melbourne-based radio station 3KZ. Until the War's end, he combined Army duties with a significant singing career with regular broadcasts from Melbourne radio and other venues. This included working with Gertrude Johnson in 1943, as part of the nascent National Theater, to produce the opera: The Magic Flute, where he appeared as Tamino. He also took the opportunity to study with Clive Carey at the Melba Memorial Conservatorium of Music. His performance activities assisted in raising thousands of pounds for the war effort and associated charities. This included a charity associated with Lady Jacobena Angliss.

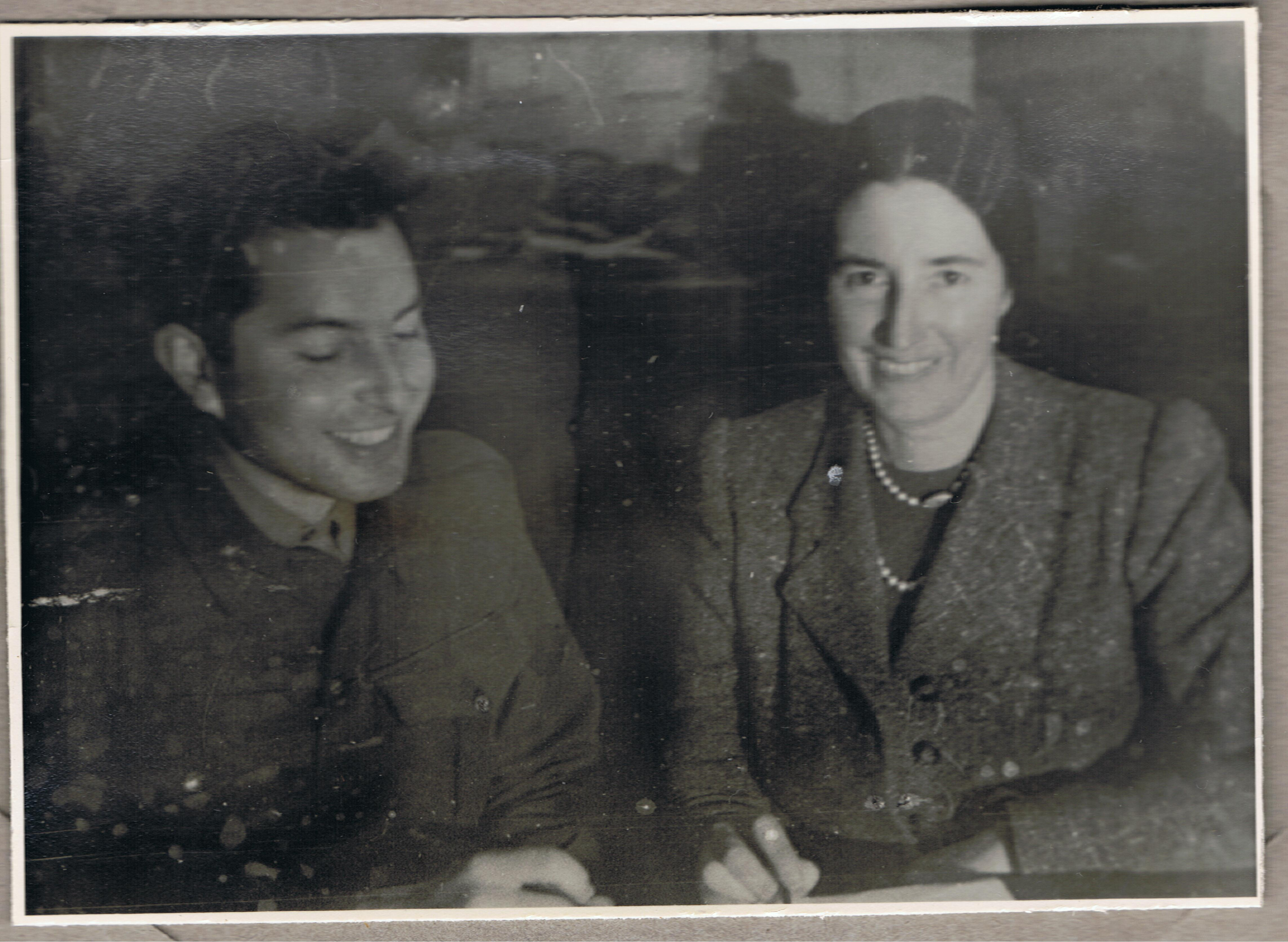
Eric Liffman and Lady Jacobena Angliss in 1944 planning a series of charitable concerts with the title "Songs the People Love".

== Return to Germany ==
Liffman was able to return to London near the end of 1946. He was eager to travel to Germany to find whether any of his parents (Hermann and Mathilde), three brothers (Alfred, Willy, Max) and a sister (Selma) had survived. He was initially refused entry into Germany, but was able to tour the occupied British zone by joining a Navy entertainment show called the "Tokio Express".

Unfortunately, his parents had been murdered in Auschwitz, but he was able to locate his sister, who had survived Auschwitz and Dachau and was living in Brussels, Belgium. His brother Max had also moved to Brussels and survived the war by living "underground", i.e., in hiding with his wife. Their daughter, Ruth, had survived by being adopted and cared for by foster parents. His brother Willy had also survived by joining the Free French Foreign Legion and fighting the Nazis in the Sahara, in particular, at Tobruk. The fate of his brother Alfred is unclear, but he did not survive the war and may have died in Minsk.

After reuniting with the remainder of his family, he toured Belgium and parts of Northern Europe.

== Return to Australia ==
The Australian Government refused to extend his visa and he returned to Australia in 1947 to pursue a musical career in and around Melbourne, where he often performed in schools, night clubs and Masonic Lodges.
