= Index of music articles =

Articles related to music include:

== 0–9 ==
- 7-limit tuning
- 15 equal temperament
- 17 equal temperament
- 19 equal temperament
- 22 equal temperament
- 23 equal temperament
- 31 equal temperament
- 34 equal temperament
- 41 equal temperament
- 53 equal temperament
- 58 equal temperament
- 72 equal temperament
- 96 equal temperament
- 20th-century classical music
- 20th-century music
- 21st-century classical music
- 833 cents scale

== A ==
- A
- A♭
- A♯
- A major
- A minor
- A-flat major
- A-flat minor
- A-sharp minor
- A cappella
- A capriccio
- A due
- A12 scale
- Abbreviation
- Abendmusik
- Ableton Live
- Absolute music
- Absolute pitch
- Accent (music)
- Accentus
- Accidental
- Accompaniment
- Acoustic enhancement
- Acoustic scale
- Ad libitum
- Adagio
- Added tone chord
- Additive rhythm
- Adonai malakh mode
- Aeneator
- Aeolian dominant scale
- Aeolian mode
- Aesthetics of music
- Air
- Air à boire
- Air de cour
- Air guitar
- Ajam (maqam)
- Akebono scale
- Albanian opera
- Alberti bass
- Album
- Aleatoric music
- Algaita
- Algerian scale
- Algorithmic composition
- All-interval tetrachord
- All-interval twelve-tone row
- Alla breve
- Allegro
- Allemande
- Alpha scale
- Alta cappella
- Altered chord
- Altered scale
- Alternate bass
- Alternatim
- Altissimo
- Alto
- Ambassel scale
- Ambrosian chant
- Ambitus (music)
- American Music Awards
- Amoebaean singing
- Amusia
- Anacrusis
- Ancient Celtic music
- Ancient music
- Andalusian cadence
- Andalusian classical music
- Andamento
- Andean music
- Anhemitonic scale
- Answer song
- Anthem
- Antiphon
- Arab tone system
- Arabic maqam
- Arabic music
- Arch form
- Archlute
- Archytas of Mytilene
- Arghul
- Aria
- Aria di sorbetto
- Arioso
- Arpeggio
- Arrangement
- Ars antiqua
- Ars nova
- Ars subtilior
- Arsis and thesis
- Art music
- Art song
- Articulation
- Artificial harmonic
- Athenaeus (musician)
- Atonality
- Attacco
- Audio mixing
- Auditory illusion
- Augmentation
- Augmented fifth
- Augmented octave
- Augmented second
- Augmented seventh
- Augmented sixth
- Augmented third
- Augmented triad
- Augmented tuning
- Augmented unison
- Ausmultiplikation
- Authentic performance
- Avant-garde music
- Avaz (music)
- Axis system
- Azione teatrale

== B ==
- B
- B♭
- B♯
- B major
- B minor
- B-flat major
- B-flat minor
- BACH motif
- Back beat
- Background music
- Backmasking
- Bagatelle (music)
- Bagpipes
- Balalaika
- Ballad opera
- Ballade
- Ballata
- Ballet (music)
- Band (music)
- BandLab
- Bar (music)
- Bar form
- Barbiton
- Barcarolle
- Bariolage
- Baritenor
- Baritone
- Baritone violin
- Baroque music
- Baroque music of the British Isles
- Baroque orchestra
- Baroque violin
- Baryton
- Basque music
- Bass (sound)
- Bass (voice type)
- Bass arpeggiation
- Bass guitar
- Bass note
- Bass run
- Bass saxophone

Bass song

- Bass violin
- Bass-baritone
- Bassanello
- Bassist
- Bassline
- Basso continuo
- Basso profondo
- Bassoon
- Baton (conducting)
- Battaglia (music)
- Bayati (maqam)
- Bayaty-Shiraz (mode)
- Bayreuth canon
- Bayreuth Festival
- Beam
- Beat (music)
- Beatmatching
- Bebung
- Beethoven and C minor
- Beethoven's compositional method
- Beethoven's musical style
- Bel canto
- Bell chord
- Bell pattern
- Bell tone
- Belting (music)
- Beneventan chant
- Berber music
- Berceuse
- Bergamask
- Beste (Turkish music)
- Beta scale
- Bicinium
- Bimodality
- Binary form
- Binaural beats
- Biomusic
- Biomusicology
- Birds in music
- Bisector (music)
- Blind octave
- Block chord
- Blue note
- Blues
- Blues ballad
- Bohlen–Pierce scale
- Bologna School of music
- Boogie woogie
- Border ballad
- Borrowed chord
- Bouzouki
- Bowed clavier
- Bowed string instrument extended technique
- Boy soprano
- Braille music
- Brass instrument
- Brass quintet
- Brass tablature
- Bravura
- Break (music)
- Breakdown (music)
- Breath mark
- Breedsma
- Bridge (music)
- Brindisi (music)
- British opera
- Broken consort
- Bruckner rhythm
- Burgundian School
- Burletta
- Bushi (music)
- Byzantine lyra
- Byzantine music

== C ==
- C
- C♯
- C major
- C minor
- C-flat major
- C-sharp major
- C-sharp minor
- Cabaletta
- Cadence
- Cadenza
- Caesura
- Call and response (music)
- Call changes
- Calypso music
- Cambiata
- Camerata (music)
- Canción
- Canon (music)
- Canntaireachd
- Cantabile
- Cantastoria
- Cantata
- Canticle
- Cantiga
- Cantillation
- Cantore al liuto
- Cantus coronatus
- Cantus firmus
- Canzona
- Canzone Napoletana
- Canzonetta
- Capo (musical device)
- Capriccio (music)
- Carnatic music
- Carnival song
- Cassation (music)
- Castrato
- Catalogue aria
- Catalogues of classical compositions
- Cauda
- Cavatina
- Celesta
- Cell (music)
- Cello
- Cello da spalla
- Cellone
- Cello sonata
- Celtic chant
- Celtic harp
- Celtic music
- Celtic music in Poland
- Music censorship
- Cent (music)
- Central American music
- C. F. E. BACH motif
- Chaconne
- Chahargah (mode)
- Chamber music
- Chamber opera
- Change ringing
- Changing tones
- Chanson
- Charlemagne and church music
- Cheironomy
- Chelys
- Chest of viols
- Chest voice
- Chiaroscuro (music)
- Chiavette

Child singer

- Citharode
- Chitarra Italiana
- Choir
- Choral concerto
- Choral symphony
- Chorale
- Chorale motet
- Chorale partita
- Chord
- Chord chart
- Chord substitution
- Chording
- Chordioid
- Chord progression
- Chord-scale system
- Chordal space
- Chroma feature
- Chromatic chord
- Chromatic circle
- Chromatic fantasia
- Chromatic fourth
- Chromatic genus
- Chromatic hexachord
- Chromatic mediant
- Chromatic scale
- Chromaticism
- Church music
- Church music in Scotland
- Cibell
- Cimbasso
- Cinquillo
- Circle of fifths
- Circular breathing
- Circus music
- Citharode
- Clapping
- Clarinet
- Clarinet trio
- Classical music
- Classical music in Scotland
- Classical music written in collaboration
- Classical period (music)
- Clausula (music)
- Clave (rhythm)
- Clavichord
- Clef
- Cleonides
- Clinic (music)
- Close and open harmony
- Closely related key
- Cloud (music)
- Coda
- Cognitive musicology
- Col legno
- Colascione
- Cologne School (music)
- Color (medieval music)
- Coloratura soprano
- Colored music notation
- Colorist (music)
- Colotomy
- Collaborative piano
- Combination tone
- Combinatoriality
- Comic opera
- Comma (music)
- Common tone (chord)
- Comping (jazz)
- Complement (music)
- Complexe sonore
- Compound metre
- Composer
- Composer tributes (classical music)
- Comprimario
- Concert
- Concert aria
- Concert band
- Concertmaster
- Concert performance
- Concert pitch
- Concert version
- Concertino (composition)
- Concerto
- Concerto for Orchestra
- Conclusion (music)
- Conducting
- Conductorless orchestra
- Conjunto
- Consonance
- Consort of instruments
- Consort song (musical)
- Constant spectrum melody
- Constant structure
- Contemporary classical music
- Contemporary harpsichord
- Contenance angloise
- Counting (music)
- Contrabass oboe
- Contrabassophone
- Contraforte
- Contralto
- Contrapuntal motion
- Contrast (music)
- Convenienze
- Coptic music
- Copula (music)
- Copyist
- Cor anglais
- Corelli cadence
- Cornamuse
- Cornett
- Count off
- Counter-melody
- Counterpoint
- Countertenor
- Country house opera
- Country music
- Courante
- Court music in Scotland
- Cover version
- Cretan lyra
- Critical edition (opera)
- Cross-dressing in music and opera
- Cross motif
- Cross-strung harp
- Crotalum
- Crusade song
- Cruciform melody
- Cubase
- Cue note
- Culture in music cognition
- Curtain call
- Cut-out score
- Cycle (music)
- Cyclic form
- Cyclic set
- Cymbal

== D ==
- D
- D♭
- D♯
- D-sharp minor
- D major
- D minor
- D-flat major
- D-flat minor
- D♯
- Da capo
- Da capo aria
- Dal segno
- Damon of Athens
- Dance music
- Dance and music of Latin America
- Darmstadt School
- Daseian notation
- Dastgah
- Dates of classical music eras
- Death growl
- Decet (music)
- Definite pitch
- Definition of music
- Degenerate music
- Degree (music)
- Delphic Hymns
- Derived row
- Descant
- Descending tetrachord
- Deutsch's scale illusion
- Diapason
- Diaschisma

* Diatessaron

- Diatonic and chromatic
- Diatonic hexachord
- Diatonic scale
- Diatonic set theory
- Didymus the Musician
- Diegetic music
- Diesis
- Digital sheet music
- Diminished fourth
- Diminished octave
- Diminished second
- Diminished seventh
- Diminished seventh chord
- Diminished sixth
- Diminished third
- Diminished triad
- Diminished tuning
- Diminution
- Discant
- Diss track
- Distance model
- Ditone
- Ditonic scale
- Divertimento
- Divisi
- Division viol
- DJ mix
- Dodeka music notation
- Dominant
- Dominant seventh sharp ninth chord
- Dorian mode
- Dorian ♭2 scale
- Dotted note
- Double bass
- Double drumming
- Double-Function Form
- Double stop
- Double tonic
- Double variation
- Double whole note
- Dramma giocoso
- Dream chord
- Dresden amen
- Dromoi
- Drone
- Drone music
- Drum
- Drum beat
- Drum cadence
- Drum kit
- Drum rudiment
- Drum stroke
- Drum solo
- DSCH motif
- Dubreq Stylophone
- Duet
- Duettino
- Dulab
- Dulcian
- Dumka (musical genre)
- Duodecet
- Duodrama
- Duration (music)
- Dyad (music)
- Dynamic tonality
- Dynamics

== E ==
- E
- E♭
- E major
- E minor
- E-flat major
- E-flat minor
- Ear training
- Early music
- Early music festivals
- Early music of the British Isles
- Early music revival
- Earworm
- Echos
- Eclecticism in music
- Ecomusicology
- Educational music
- Eighth note
- Ekphonetic notation
- Elastic scoring
- Electronic music
- Electric piano
- Electronic musical instrument
- Electronic voice phenomenon

* Elementa harmonica

- Elements of music
- Eleventh
- Eleventh chord
- Emancipation of the dissonance
- Embodied music cognition
- Encore
- English art song
- English bagpipes
- English cadence
- English Musical Renaissance
- Enharmonic
- Enharmonic keyboard
- Enharmonic scale
- Enigmatic scale
- Ensalada (music)
- Entr'acte
- Entrainment
- Environmentalism in music
- Epidiapente
- Equal temperament
- Equivalence class (music)
- Escala nordestina
- Estampie
- Étude
- Ethnomusicology
- Euclidean rhythm
- Euouae
- Evolutionary musicology
- Experimental musical instrument
- Exposition (music)
- Expression pedal
- Extended technique
- Extended vocal technique
- Extension (music)
- Eye movement in music reading
- Eye music

== F ==
- F
- F♯
- F major
- F minor
- F-flat major
- F-sharp major
- F-sharp minor
- F+ (pitch)
- Factor (chord)
- Faking (Western classical music)
- Falset (music)
- Falsetto
- Falsettone
- False relation
- Falsobordone
- Fandango
- Fantasia (music)
- Farandole
- Farsa
- Fasıl
- Music and fashion
- Fauxbourdon
- Feedback
- Fermata
- Festa teatrale
- Fifteenth
- Fifth (chord)
- Figure (music)
- Figured bass
- Filk music
- Fill (music)
- Film score
- Finale concertato
- Finale (music)
- Finale (software)
- Finalis
- Fingerboard
- Fingering (music)
- Finger vibrato
- Finnish tango
- Fioritura
- First inversion
- First Viennese School
- The Five (composers)
- Five-finger exercise
- Five-limit tuning
- Five string violin
- Flamenco mode
- Flat (music)
- Flugelhorn
- Flute
- Flute choir
- Flute quartet
- Folia
- Folk instrument
- Folk music
- Formalism (music)
- Formula composition
- Forte
- Fortepiano
- Fortepiano (musical dynamic)
- Fortspinnung
- Four note group
- Four on the floor (music)
- Four-part harmony
- Fragmentation (music)
- Franco-Flemish School
- Frankfurt Group
- Franssen effect
- French classical music
- French horn
- French opera
- French overture
- French pop music
- Frequency
- Fret
- Friction idiophone
- Fugue
- Function (music)
- Fundamental structure
- Furniture music
- Futurism (music)

== G ==
- G
- G♭
- G♯
- G major
- G minor
- G-flat major
- G-sharp major
- G-sharp minor
- G run
- Gagaku
- Galliard
- Gallican chant
- Gamelan
- Gamelan notation
- Gamma scale
- GarageBand
- Gavotte
- Gebrauchsmusik
- Geisslerlieder
- Generalized keyboard
- Generative music
- Generative theory of tonal music
- Generic and specific intervals
- Genus (music)
- German organ schools
- Ghost note
- Gigue
- Giovane scuola
- Glee
- Glissando
- Glissando illusion
- Glockenspiel
- Gong
- Gongche notation
- GNU LilyPond
- Grace note
- Grand motet
- Grand opera
- Grandsire
- Graphic notation (music)
- Grave (music)
- Greek musical instruments
- Gregorian chant
- Gregorian mode
- Groove
- Group of Eight (music)
- Group piano
- Grupo de los cuatro
- Grupo renovación
- Guidonian hand
- Guitar
- Guitar solo
- Gymel

== H ==
- Hagiopolitan Octoechos
- Half diminished scale
- Half note
- Half-time (music)
- Hammond organ
- Hang (instrument)
- Harmolodics
- Harmonic
- Harmonic major scale
- Harmonic rhythm
- Harmonic scale
- Harmonic series (music)
- Harmonic seventh
- Harmonization
- Harmony
- Harp
- Harpsichord
- Harpsichord-viola
- Hauptstimme
- Haute-contre
- Head (music)
- Head voice
- Helmholtz pitch notation
- Hemiola
- Heptatonic scale
- Hexachord
- Hexatonic scale
- Heyrati
- Hip hop
- Hirajōshi scale
- Hirtenschalmei
- Historically informed performance
- History of lute-family instruments
- History of music
- History of music in the biblical period
- History of music publishing
- History of sonata form
- History of the harpsichord
- History of the violin
- Holdrian comma
- Holophonics
- Humayun (mode)
- Homophony
- Homotonal
- Hornbostel-Sachs
- Hundred twenty-eighth note
- Hungarian minor scale
- Hurrian songs
- Hydraulis of Dion
- Hymn
- Hyperrealism (music)
- Hypoaeolian mode
- Hypoionian mode
- Hypophrygian mode

== I ==
- ii–V–I progression
- Illusory continuity of tones
- Illusory discontinuity
- Imitation (music)
- Implication-Realization
- Impressionism in music
- Impromptu
- Improvisation
- In scale
- Incidental music
- Incipit
- Incomplete repetition
- Incomposite interval
- Indefinite pitch
- Indeterminacy (music)
- Indian Classical Music
- Industrial music
- Inganno
- Inharmonicity
- In scale
- Insects in music
- Insen scale
- Instrumental idiom
- Instrumentation (music)
- Intabulation
- Interactive music
- Interdominant
- Intermedio
- Intermezzo
- Interonset interval
- Interpolation (classical music)
- Interval
- Interval class
- Interval cycle
- Interval ratio
- Interval root
- Interval vector
- Intonation
- Introduction (music)
- Intuitive music
- Inversion (music)
- Ionian mode
- Irmos
- Irrational rhythm
- Irregular resolution
- Islamic music
- Ison (music)
- Isorhythm
- Israeli Metal Bands
- Istrian scale
- Italian opera
- Italian overture
- Iwato scale

== J ==
- Japanese mode
- Japanese musical scales
- Jazz
- Jazz standard
- Jins
- Jubilus
- Just intonation

== K ==
- Kamancheh
- Kammersänger
- Kapellmeister
- Karabakh Shikastasi (mode)
- Karamuza
- Karaoke
- Kawala
- Kemençe of the Black Sea
- Key
- Key signature
- Key signature names and translations
- Keyboard bass
- Keyboard instrument
- Keyboard tablature
- Keyboardist
- Khrennikov's Seven
- Klang (music)
- Klangfarbenmelodie
- Kleisma
- Kollops
- Korean court music
- Koron (music)
- Kortholt
- Krakebs
- Kwitra

== L ==
- L'istesso tempo
- Lacuna (music)
- Lament bass
- Landini cadence
- Larghetto
- Layali
- Leading-tone
- Lead instrument
- Lead sheet
- Ledger line
- Legato
- Leitmotif
- Les Six
- Letter notation
- Level (music)
- Libretto
- Lied
- Ligature
- Lilting
- Limenius
- Limit (music)
- Linear
- Linear progression
- Lining out
- Linzer Orgeltabulatur
- Lisztomania
- Literaturoper
- Live electronic music
- Locrian mode
- Longa (music)
- Ludomusicology
- Luri music
- Lute
- Lute song
- Lydian augmented scale
- Lydian cadence
- Lydian mode
- Lyra viol

== M ==
- Madrigal
- Madrigal (Trecento)
- Madrigal comedy
- Madrigale spirituale
- Maestoso
- Maestro
- Magadis
- Magic chord
- Major chord
- Major fourth and minor fifth
- Major limma
- Major Locrian scale
- Major second
- Major scale
- Major seventh
- Major sixth
- Major third
- Mandola
- Mannheim school
- Manualism (hand music)
- Manuscript paper
- Māori music
- March (music)
- Marching band
- Mariachi
- Marimba
- Martial music
- Mashup (music)
- Masonic music
- Mass (music)
- Matrix (music)
- Maxima (music)
- Maximal evenness
- Mazurka
- McGurk effect
- Meantone temperament
- Measure
- Mediant
- Medieval music
- Melharmony
- Melisma
- Melodic expectation
- Melodic fission
- Melodic motion
- Melodic pattern
- Melodrama
- Melody
- Melody type
- Mensural notation
- Mensurstrich
- Messa di voce
- Method (music)
- Method ringing
- Metre (hymn)
- Metre (music)
- Metric modulation
- Metronome
- Mezzo-soprano
- Micropolyphony
- Microsound
- Microtonal music
- Middle Eastern music
- MIDI
- MIDI tuning standard
- Military band
- Millioctave
- Miming in instrumental performance
- Minimal music
- Minnesang
- Minor chord
- Minor diatonic semitone
- Minor second
- Minor scale
- Minor seventh
- Minor sixth
- Minor third
- Minuet
- Missing fundamental
- Mistuning
- Mix tape
- Mixed-interval chord
- Mixing
- Mixolydian mode
- Modal frame
- Modal voice
- Mode
- Modernism (music)
- Modes of limited transposition
- Modified Stave Notation
- Modular music
- Modulation (music)
- Modus (medieval music)
- Moment form
- Monad (music)
- Money note
- Monodrama
- Monody
- Monophony
- Monotonic scale
- Motet
- Motet-chanson
- Motif (music)
- Motorik
- Mouthpiece (brass)
- Mouthpiece (woodwind)
- Movement (music)
- Mozarabic chant
- Mozart and G minor
- Mozart effect
- Multiphonic
- Multiplication (music)
- Muqam
- Museme

* Music

- Music acquisition
- Music alignment
- Music and artificial intelligence
- Music and emotion
- Music and mathematics
- Music and politics
- Music appreciation
- Music archaeology
- Music as a coping strategy
- Music box
- Music community
- Music criticism
- Music drama
- Music education
- Music Encoding Initiative
- Music engraving
- Music examination
- Music festival
- Music genre
- Music history
- Music journalism
- Music industry
- Music in early modern Scotland
- Music in Medieval England
- Music in Medieval Scotland
- Music in Paris
- Music in psychological operations
- Music in space
- Music in Tatarstan
- Music learning theory
- Music lesson
- Music librarianship
- Music manuscript
- Musico
- Music of Afghanistan
- Music of Albania
- Music of Algeria
- Music of Ancient Greece
- Music of Andorra
- Music of Argentina
- Music of Armenia
- Music of Australia
- Music of Austria
- Music of Badakhshan
- Music of Bahrain
- Music of Barbados
- Music of Belarus
- Music of Belgium
- Music of Belize
- Music of Bermuda
- Music of Bolivia
- Music of Bosnia and Herzegovina
- Music of Brazil
- Music of Brunei
- Music of Bulgaria
- Music of Canada
- Music of Catalonia
- Music of Chile
- Music of Colombia
- Music of Costa Rica
- Music of Croatia
- Music of Cuba
- Music of Cyprus
- Music of Denmark
- Music of Easter Island
- Music of Ecuador
- Music of Egypt
- Music of El Salvador
- Music of Epirus (Greece)
- Music of Estonia
- Music of Fiji
- Music of Finland
- Music of France
- Music of French Guiana
- Music of Georgia (country)
- Music of Germany-
- Music of Guadeloupe
- Music of Guatemala
- Music of Guyana
- Music of Haiti
- Music of Hawaii
- Music of Honduras
- Music of Hungary
- Music of Iceland
- Music of India
- Music of Indonesia
- Music of Iraq
- Music of Ireland
- Music of Jamaica
- Music of Jordan
- Music of Kazakhstan
- Music of Kenya
- Music of Kuwait
- Music of Latvia
- Music of Lebanon
- Music of Libya
- Music of Liechtenstein
- Music of Lithuania
- Music of Luxembourg
- Music of Malta
- Music of Martinique
- Music of Mauritius
- Music of Mesopotamia
- Music of Mexico
- Music of Moldova
- Music of Monaco
- Music of Mongolia
- Music of Montenegro
- Music of Morocco
- Music of Myanmar
- Music of Namibia
- Music of New Zealand
- Music of Nicaragua
- Music of Niue
- Music of North Macedonia
- Music of Norway
- Music of Oman
- Music of Palestine
- Music of Panama
- Music of Paraguay
- Music of Peru
- Music of Poland
- Music of Polynesia
- Music of Portugal
- Music of Puerto Rico
- Music of Qatar
- Music of Russia
- Music of San Marino
- Music of Samoa
- Music of Saudi Arabia
- Music of Scotland
- Music of Scotland in the eighteenth century
- Music of Scotland in the nineteenth century
- Music of Serbia
- Music of Seychelles
- Music of Singapore
- Music of Slovakia
- Music of Slovenia
- Music of South Korea
- Music of Sweden
- Music of Switzerland
- Music of Syria
- Music of Thailand
- Music of Thessaly
- Music of the Bahamas
- Music of the Cayman Islands
- Music of the Channel Islands
- Music of the Comoros
- Music of the Czech Republic
- Music of the Dominican Republic
- Music of the Faroe Islands
- Music of the Federated States of Micronesia
- Music of the Lesser Antilles
- Music of the Maldives
- Music of the Netherlands
- Music of the Philippines
- Music of the Trecento
- Music of the Turks and Caicos Islands
- Music of the United Arab Emirates
- Music of the United Kingdom
- Music of Tibet
- Music of Tokelau
- Music of Tonga
- Music of Tunisia
- Music of Turkey
- Music of Ukraine
- Music of Uruguay
- Music of Vatican City
- Music of Venezuela
- Music of Vienna
- Music of Vietnam
- Music of Western Sahara
- Music of Yemen
- Music of Zambia
- Music of Zimbabwe
- Music piracy
- Music psychology
- Music publisher (sheet music)
- Music-related memory
- Music school
- Music-specific disorders
- Music stand
- Music technology
- Music theory
- Music therapy
- Music tourism
- Music transposer
- Music venue
- MusicWriter
- Musica ficta
- Musica poetica
- Musica reservata
- Musical acoustics
- Musical argument
- Musical composition
- Musical cryptogram
- Musical development
- Musical ensemble
- Musical expression
- Musical form
- Musical gesture
- Musical hallucinations
- Musical historicism
- Musical instrument
- Musical keyboard
- Musical literacy
- Musical notation
- Musical note
- Musical phrasing
- Musical prefix
- Musical semantics
- Musical setting
- Musical similarity
- Musical syntax
- Musical system of ancient Greece
- Musical technique
- Musical tone
- Musical tuning
- Musicality
- Musician
- Musicology
- Musique mesurée
- Mute (music)
- Mystic chord

== N ==
- Nashville Number System
- Natural (music)
- Neapolitan scale
- Neapolitan School
- Nenano
- Neobyzantine Octoechos
- Neoconservative postmodernism
- Neo-Medieval music
- Neue Deutsche Härte
- Neume
- Neuroscience of music
- Neutral interval
- Neutral sixth
- New-age music
- New German School
- New interfaces for musical expression
- New Music Manchester
- New musicology
- New Venice School
- Niente
- Ninth
- Ninth chord
- Nocturne
- Noise music
- Nomos
- Nonchord tone
- Nonet (music)
- Non-lexical vocables in music
- Notehead
- Note nere
- Notes inégales
- Notre-Dame school
- Novelette (music)
- Novelty song
- Number (music)
- Numbered musical notation
- Number opera
- Numerical sight-singing

== O ==
- Obbligato
- Oboe
- Oboe da caccia
- Octatonic scale
- Octave
- Octave band
- Octave glissando
- Octave illusion
- Octave species
- Octet (music)
- Octoechos
- "Ode-to-Napoleon" hexachord
- Oeldorf Group
- Offstage instrument or choir part in classical music
- Oktavist
- Oltremontani
- Olympus (musician)
- One-third octave
- Open chord
- Opera
- Opéra-ballet
- Opera buffa
- Opéra comique
- Opéra féerie
- Opera house
- Opera in Arabic
- Opera in English
- Opera in German
- Opera in Scotland
- Opera semiseria
- Opera seria
- Operetta
- Optical music recognition
- Opus number
- Oratorio
- Orchestra
- Orchestral enhancement
- Orchestra hit
- Orchestra pit
- Orchestration
- Orff Schulwerk
- Organ
- Organ tablature
- Organetto
- Organology
- Organum
- Oriental riff
- Origin of the harp in Europe
- Origins of opera
- Oriscus
- Ornament (music)
- Orwell comma
- Ostinato
- Ossia
- Otonality and Utonality
- Ottoman classical music
- Oversinging
- Overtone
- Overture

== P ==
- Pandiatonicism
- Pandura
- Papadic Octoechos
- Parallel and counter parallel
- Parallel harmony
- Parallel key
- Paraphrase mass
- Pardessus de viole
- Auditory pareidolia
- Parlour music
- Parody mass
- Parody music
- Parsons code
- Part (music)
- Partbook-
- Partimento
- Partita
- Pasodoble
- Passacaglia
- Passaggio
- Passing chord
- Passion music
- Pasticcio
- Pastorale
- Pastorale héroïque
- Patter song
- Pattern completion
- Pavane
- Peal
- Pedal keyboard
- Pedal point
- Pedal tone
- Pelog
- Pensato
- Pentachord
- Pentatonic scale
- Percussion instrument
- Percussion notation
- Perfect fourth
- Perfect fifth
- Period (music)
- Permutation (music)

* Perpetuum mobile

- Persian scale
- Persian traditional music
- Pervading imitation
- Pesante
- Petasti
- Petrushka chord
- Philosophy of music
- Phonograph
- Phorminx
- Phrase (music)
- Phrygian dominant scale
- Phrygian mode
- Piano
- Piano ballade
- Piano concerto
- Piano duet
- Piano extended technique
- Piano four hands
- Piano history and musical performance
- Piano key frequencies
- Piano pedagogy
- Piano pedals
- Piano piece
- Piano quartet
- Piano quintet
- Piano sextet
- Piano six hands
- Piano solo
- Piano sonata
- Piano trio
- Piano-vocal score
- Pianto
- Picardy third
- Piccolo
- Piccolo heckelphone
- Piccolo oboe
- Piccolo trumpet
- Pièce d'occasion
- Pierrot ensemble
- Pipe band
- Pipe organ
- Piston valve
- Pitch
- Pitch axis theory
- Pitch circularity
- Pitch class
- Pitch class space
- Pitch contour
- Pitch interval
- Pitch of brass instruments
- Pitch space
- Pitch wheel
- Pit orchestra
- Pizzicato
- Plain hunt
- Plainsong
- Playing by ear
- Polish opera
- Polychord
- Polyphonic Era
- Polyphony
- Polyrhythm
- Polystylism
- Polytempo
- Polytonality
- Pop music
- Popular music
- Portamento
- Portato
- Positive organ
- Postminimalism
- Postmodern music
- Post-tonal music theory
- Potpourri (music)
- Power chord
- Precomposition
- Predominant chord
- Prehistoric music
- Prelude (music)
- Prelude and fugue
- Preparation (music)
- Prima donna
- Primary tone
- Primary triad
- Principal (music)
- Privileged pattern
- Process music
- Program music
- Progressive music
- Progressive tonality
- Projected set
- Prolation
- Prolation canon
- Prolongation
- Promenade concert
- Prompter (opera)
- Prosodion
- Prosody (music)
- Pro Tools
- Protein music
- Protest song
- Psaltery
- Pseudo-octave
- Psychedelic music
- Psychoacoustics
- Psychoanalysis and music
- Psychology of music preference
- Ptolemy's intense diatonic scale
- Public domain music
- Pulse
- Punctualism
- Pygmy music
- Pyknon
- Pythagorean comma
- Pythagorean hammers
- Pythagorean interval
- Pythagorean tuning

== Q ==
- Qanun (instrument)
- Quartal and quintal harmony
- Quarter-comma meantone
- Quarter note
- Quarter tone
- Quartet
- Quintet
- Quintuple meter
- Quintus (vocal music)
- Quodlibet

== R ==
- Rackett
- Radio opera
- Raga
- Rage aria
- Range (music)
- Ragisma
- Rast (mode)
- Rastrum
- Rauschpfeife
- Realization (figured bass)
- Rebec
- Recapitulation (music)
- Recitative
- Reciting tone
- Record label
- Reduction (music)
- Reed contrabass
- Reggae
- Register (music)
- Registration (organ)
- Regular diatonic tuning
- Rehearsal letter
- Relative key
- Relative pitch
- Relaxation
- Religious music
- Remix
- Renaissance music
- Repeat sign
- Répertoire International des Sources Musicales
- Répétiteur
- Repetition (music)
- Requiem
- Reprise
- Rescue opera
- Research in music education
- Resolution (music)
- Resonance
- Rest (music)
- Retrograde (music)
- Retrograde inversion
- Rhaita
- Rhapsody (music)
- Rhoptron
- Rhythm
- Rhythm in Arabic music
- Rhythm section
- Rhythmic gesture
- Rhythmic mode
- Rhythmic unit
- Ribbon controller
- Ricercar
- Riddim
- Riff
- Ripieno
- Ripieno concerto
- Ritornello
- Ritsu and ryo scales
- Rock music
- Rock music in France
- Rock music in Poland
- Rock music in Portugal
- Rock music in Russia
- Roman School
- Romantic music
- Romantische Oper
- Rondalla
- Rondellus
- Rondo
- Rondò
- Root (chord)
- Rosegarden
- Rosette (music)
- Rotary valve
- Rothphone
- Roulade (music)
- Round (music)
- Rubab (instrument)
- Rule of the octave
- Rumba
- Russian classical music
- Russian opera
- Russian romance

== S ==
- Sacher hexachord
- Schenkerian analysis
- Schoenberg hexachord
- Sacred Harp
- Sainete
- Saint Martial school
- Salpinx
- Sámi music
- Sampling (music)
- Sarabande
- Sarrusophone
- Satz
- Savart
- Savoy opera
- Saxophone
- Scale (music)
- Scale of harmonics
- Scale-step
- Scherzo
- Schisma
- Schismatic temperament
- Science fiction opera
- Scientific pitch notation
- Scordatura
- Scratching
- Scroll (music)
- Second inversion
- Second Viennese School
- Seconda pratica
- Secondary dominant
- Section (music)
- Secular music
- Secundal
- Segah
- Segue (music)
- Seikilos epitaph
- Semicomma
- Semi-contrabassoon
- Semitone
- Sensitive style
- Sentence (music)
- Septet
- Septimal chromatic semitone
- Septimal comma
- Septimal diatonic semitone
- Septimal diesis
- Septimal kleisma
- Septimal major third
- Septimal meantone temperament
- Septimal minor third
- Septimal quarter tone
- Septimal semicomma
- Septimal third tone
- Septimal tritone
- Septimal whole tone
- Sequence (music)
- Sequence (musical form)
- Serenade
- Serialism
- Seventh (chord)
- Seventh chord
- Seventh octave
- Sextet
- Sextuple metre
- Shakuhachi musical notation
- Shape note
- Sharawadji effect
- Sharp (music)
- Sheet music
- Shepard tone
- Shinto music
- Shorthand for orchestra instrumentation
- Short octave
- Shur (mugham)
- Shushtar (mode)
- Sibelius (scorewriter)
- Siciliana
- Siffernotskrift
- Sigah
- Similarity relation (music)
- Simplified music notation
- Sinfonia
- Sinfonia concertante
- Singakademie
- Singing
- Singing school
- Single (music)
- Singspiel
- Sight-reading
- Simple meter
- Simultaneity
- Sixteenth note
- Sixth
- Sixth chord
- Sketch (music)
- Skolion
- Slash chord
- Slide (musical ornament)
- Slide trumpet
- Slur (music)
- Social history of the piano
- Sociomusicology
- Soft pedal
- Soggetto cavato
- Solfège
- Solita forma
- Solmization
- Solo
- Solo tuning
- Sonata
- Sonata cycle
- Sonata da chiesa
- Sonata form
- Sonata theory
- Sonatina
- Son clave
- Song
- Song cycle
- Song structure
- Sonorism
- Sopranino saxophone
- Sopranino voice
- Sopranissimo
- Sopranist
- Soprano
- Soprano sfogato
- Sordun
- Sori (music)
- Sostenuto
- Sotto voce (music)
- Soul music
- Sound
- Sound and music computing
- Sound hole
- Sound icon
- Sound quality
- Sound recording and reproduction
- Sound sculpture
- Sound system
- Spaltklang
- Spanish opera
- Spatial music
- Speech-to-song illusion
- Spectral music
- Spiccato
- Spieloper
- Spinto
- Spinto soprano
- Spiral array model
- Spontaneous composition
- Sprechgesang
- Squillo
- Stab (music)
- Staccato
- Staff (music)
- Stagione
- Stem (music)
- Stentato
- Stile concertato
- Stile concitato
- Stile rappresentativo
- Sting (musical phrase)
- Sting (percussion)
- Stochastic
- Stopped note
- Strain (music)
- Strähle's construction
- Stretto
- String instrument
- String octet
- String piano
- String quartet
- String quintet
- String resonance
- String section
- String sextet
- String trio
- Strophic form
- Style brisé
- Sub-bass
- Subdominant
- Submediant
- Subminor and supermajor
- Subtonic
- Suite
- Sung-through
- Superius
- Supertonic
- Suspension (music)
- Sustain pedal
- Suzuki method
- Swing
- Symmetric scale
- Symmetry
- Sympathetic string
- Sympathy (music)
- Symphonic music in Iran
- Symphonic poem
- Symphony
- Syncopation
- Synthesizer
- Synthetic mode
- Synthetic scale
- Syntonic comma
- Syriac sacral music
- Systematic musicology
- Systems music

== T ==
- Tablature
- Table canon
- Tacet
- Tafelmusik
- Tambouras
- Tambourine
- Tarantella
- Tarantella Napoletana
- Tasto solo
- Tatum (music)
- Temperament
- Temperament ordinaire
- Tempo
- Tempo rubato
- Tenor
- Tenor violin
- Tenore contraltino
- Tenore di grazia
- Tenoroon
- Tension (music)
- Tenuto
- Ternary form
- Tertian
- Tertium major
- Terzschritt
- Tessitura
- Tetrachord
- Tetrad (music)
- Tetratonic scale
- Text declamation
- Texture
- Theatre music
- Thematic transformation
- Theorbo
- Theoretical key
- Third (chord)
- Thirteenth
- Thirty-second note
- Thirty-two-bar form
- Three-hand effect
- Three-key exposition
- Through-composed
- Thumb position
- Tie (music)
- Tiento
- Timbre
- Timbre composition
- Timeline of Italian music
- Time point
- Time signature
- Time unit box system
- Timing (music)
- Timpani
- Tiorbino
- Toccata
- Tonality
- Tonality diamond
- Tonality flux
- Tone
- Tone Clock
- Tone cluster
- Tone row
- Tongan music notation
- Tonic (music)
- Tonicization
- Tonic Sol-fa
- Tonnetz
- Tonus peregrinus
- Total chromatic
- Totalism
- Trance music
- Traditional Gaelic music
- Tragédie en musique

* Traité de l'harmonie réduite à ses principes naturels

- Transcription (music)
- Transformation (music)
- Transformational theory
- Transition from Renaissance to Baroque in instrumental music
- Transposing instrument
- Transposition (music)

* Treatise on Instrumentation

- Treble (sound)
- Treble flute
- Treble voice
- Tremolo
- Tresillo (rhythm)
- Triad (music)
- Triangle (musical instrument)
- Trigonon
- Trill
- Triple contrabass viol
- Tritone
- Tritone paradox
- Tritone substitution
- Tritonic scale
- Triumphal march
- Trombone
- Troubadour
- Trouvère
- Trumpet
- Trumpet voluntary
- TTBB
- Tuba
- Tuna (music)
- Tuning
- Tuplet
- Turkish Five
- Turkish folk music
- Turkish music (style)
- Turnaround (music)
- Turntablism
- Tutti
- Twelve-tone technique
- Two hundred fifty-sixth note
- Tydorel
- Tympanum

== U ==
- Ukrainian Dorian scale
- Undertone series
- Unfigured bass
- Unfolding (music)
- Unified field
- Unison

== V ==
- Vamp (music)
- Variation (music)
- Venetian polychoral style
- Venetian School (music)
- Verismo
- Vernacular music
- Verrophone
- Verse anthem
- Verse–chorus form
- Vertical viola
- Vibraphone
- Vibrato
- Video game music
- Vienna horn
- Vienna New Year's Concert
- Viennese trichord
- Villanella
- Viol
- Viola
- Viola bastarda
- Viola d'amore
- Viola organista
- Viola pomposa
- Viola profonda
- Violin
- Violin family
- Violin octet
- Violin sonata
- Violino piccolo
- Violotta
- Virelai
- Virtuoso
- Vocal fry register
- Vocal music
- Vocal pedagogy
- Vocal range
- Vocal register
- Vocal weight
- Vogel's Tonnetz
- Voice classification in non-classical music
- Voice crossing
- Voice exchange
- Voicing (music)
- Voluntary (music)

== W ==
- Wagner tuba
- Wah-wah
- Waltz (music)
- War of the Romantics
- Water organ
- Well temperament
- White voice
- Wienerlied
- Whole note
- Wind instrument
- Wind quartet
- Wind quintet
- Women in music
- Woodwind doubler
- Woodwind instrument
- Woodwind quartet
- Wolf interval
- Word painting
- Wordless functional analysis

== X ==
- Xenharmonic
- Xenochrony
- Xhosa music
- Xylophone

== Y ==
- Yanny or Laurel
- Yo scale
- Yoruba music

== Z ==
- Zarzuela
- Zeitoper
- Zhonghu
- Zither
- Znamenny chant
- Zoomusicology
- Zukra

== Lists ==
- Chord progressions
- Chords
- Chronological lists of classical composers
- Classical and art music traditions
- Classical music concerts with an unruly audience response
- classical music genres
- Composers
- Cultural and regional genres of music
- Italian musical terms used in English
- Major/minor compositions
- Major opera composers
- Meantone intervals
- Music museums
- Music software
- Music styles
- Music theorists
- Musical instruments
- Musical instruments by Hornbostel–Sachs number
- Musical scales and modes
- Musical symbols
- Musicology topics
- Opera librettists
- Ornaments
- Performances of French grand operas at the Paris Opéra
- Period instruments
- Pipe organ stops
- Pitch intervals
- Principal conductors by orchestra
- List of program music
- Quarter tone pieces
- Styles of music: A–F
- Styles of music: G–M
- Styles of music: N–R
- Styles of music: S–Z
- Symphony orchestras
- Tone rows and series
- Outline of the Beatles
- Outline of the Doors

== See also ==
- Outline of music
- Glossary of musical terminology
- Glossary of Italian music
- Timeline of musical events
