= Tetratonic scale =

Musical scale with 4 pitches per octave

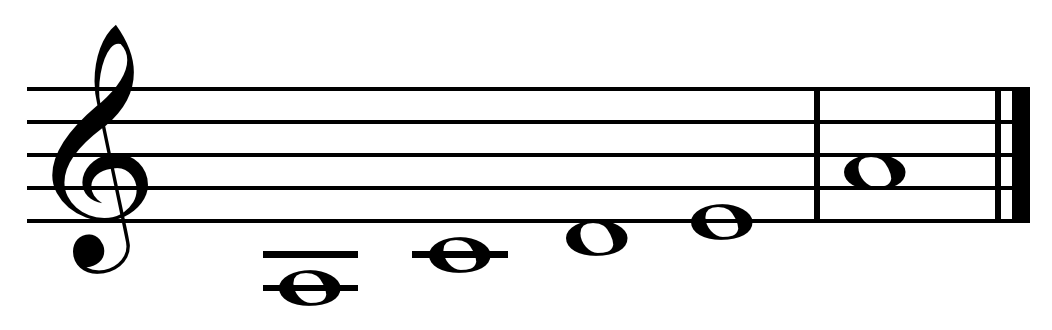
Example tetratonic scale.

A tetratonic scale is a musical scale or mode with four notes per octave. This is in contrast to a heptatonic (seven-note) scale such as the major scale and minor scale, or a dodecatonic (chromatic 12-note) scale, both common in modern Western music. Tetratonic scales are not common in modern art music, and are generally associated with prehistoric music.

== Distribution ==
=== Native American music ===
Tetratonic scales were common among the Plains Indians, though less common than the pentatonic scale. Amongst the Arapaho, Blackfoot, Crow, Omaha, Kiowa, Pawnee, and Sioux, as well as some Plateau tribes, especially the Flathead, the tetratonic and pentatonic scales used are anhemitonic (that is, they do not include semitones). Tetratonic scales have also been noted among the music of the Creek Indians, and in the Great Basin region among the Washo, Ute, Paiute, and Shoshone. In the Southwest, the Navajo people also largely used the pentatonic and tetratonic, occasionally also tritonic scales.

=== Inuit ===
Tetratonic music was known among the Inuit, including the Greenlandic peoples.

=== Maori ===
A 1969 study by ethnomusicologist Mervyn McLean noted that tetratonic scales were the second-most common type among the Maori tribes surveyed, accounting for 31% of scales used. The most common were tritonic (3-note) scales at 47%, while the third-most was ditonic (two-note) scales at 17%.

=== Oceania ===
Tetratonic music was noted as common in Polynesia and Melanesia. On Guadalcanal in particular, anhemitonic pentatonic and tetratonic scales are the predominant types, although the minor second does nevertheless occasionally appear as a melodic interval. The most often used melodic intervals, however, are the major second, minor third, perfect fourth, perfect fifth, and octave.

=== Africa ===
The main instrument in the Lobi area of Ghana is the xylophone, some of which are tuned to a tetratonic scale. In eastern Uganda, the Gwere use for their six-string harp (called tongoli) a tetratonic scale in which all the intervals are nearly equal, which to Western ears sounds like a chain of minor thirds.

In South Africa, the San use a tetratonic scale approaching 5 equal temperament, but lacking the second step.

=== India ===
Tetratonic, as well as tritonic scales, were commonly used by the tribal peoples of India, such as the Juang and Bhuyan of Orissa state.

=== Russia ===
The music of the Volga-Finnic Cheremis (Mari people) of central Russia was primarily pentatonic, but used tetratonic scales 20% of the time.

=== Western Europe ===
The second-earliest scales of Scandinavian, German, English, and Scottish folk music are believed to have been pentatonic, themselves developed from an earlier tetratonic scale. Tetratonic scales, along with pentatonic scales, account for 54% of songs in the traditional joik repertoire of the European Arctic Sami people, where the singing range extends to a tenth or eleventh.

The predominant style of traditional music from the Peloponnese region of Greece is a mixture of Christian, Albanian, and Vlach. It employs tetratonic, pentachordal, and pentatonic scales, around the notes of which microtonal ornamentation (stolidia/psevtikes) occurs.

=== Art music ===
The trio of the scherzo from Ludwig van Beethoven’s Hammerklavier Sonata uses only notes from the B♭ minor and D♭ major triads.

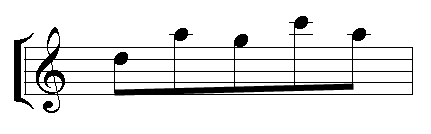
Basic five-note unit of Reed Phase, by Steve Reich

A rare example of an art-music composition based entirely on a tetratonic scale is the early minimalist work Reed Phase (1966), by Steve Reich, which is based entirely on a single five-note cell, or "basic unit", repeated continually throughout the entire work. Because the note A occurs twice in this pattern, there are only four pitches in all.
