= Bologna School =

Bologna School may refer to:

- Bolognese school, school of painting in Bologna, Italy
- Bologna School, a Roman Catholic school of ecclesiastical history
- Bologna School of music, term for a group of composers active in 17th century Bologna
