= Dromos =

Dromos may refer to:

- Cursus publicus, the public road system of the Roman and Byzantine empires
- Dromos, in architecture, an entrance passage or avenue leading to a building
- Dromoi, modes (types of scales) used in Greek music
