= Wind quartet =

Musical ensemble with brass and woodwind

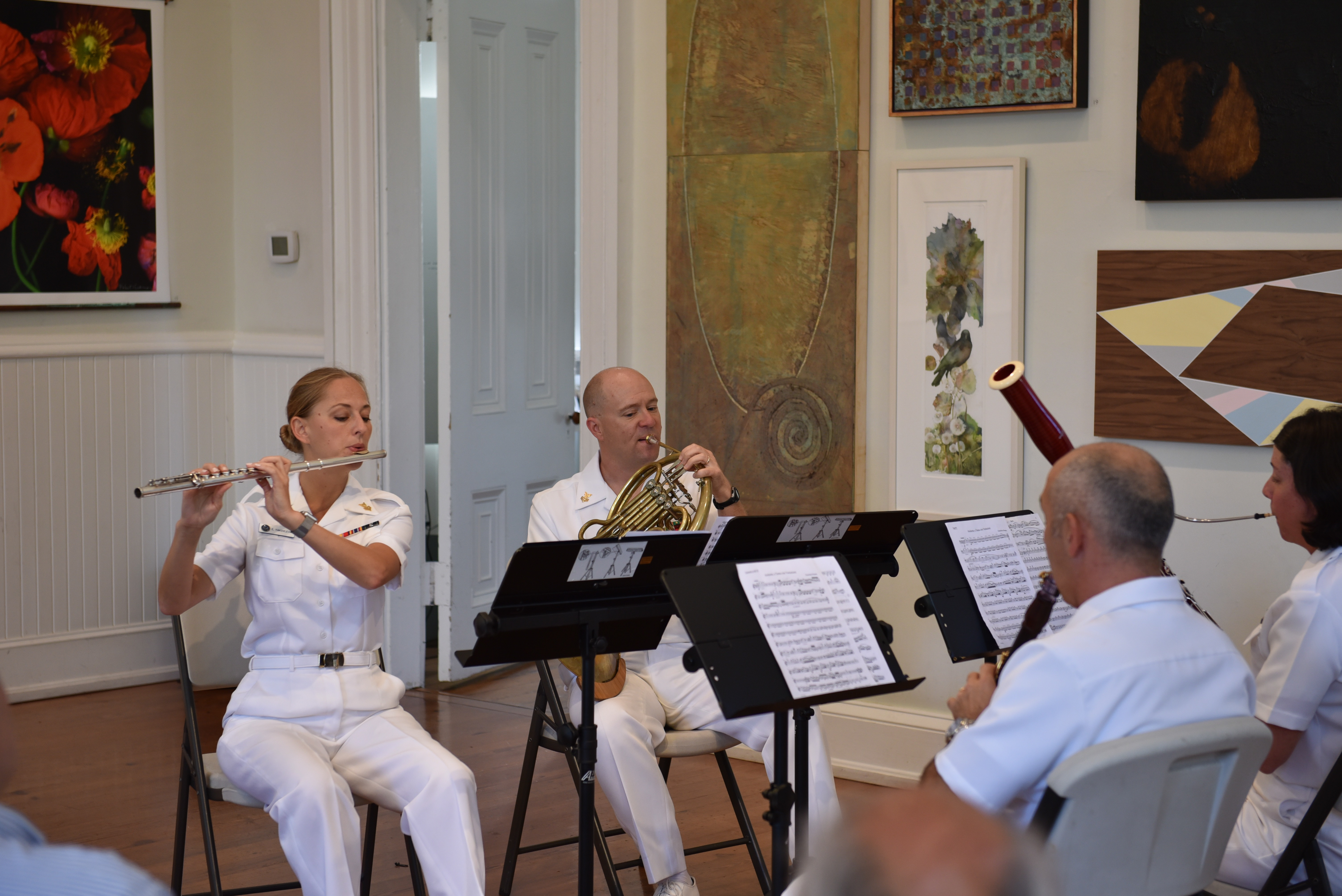
A wind quartet of the US Navy

3 Wind Quartets, Op. 4; Vincenzo Gambaro

A wind quartet is an ensemble consisting of four brass and woodwind instruments, or music written for a combination of four such instruments. It is distinct therefore from the woodwind quartet (usually flute, oboe, clarinet and bassoon), brass quartet (usually two trumpets, horn or baritone horn, and trombone), and quartets made up of a single instrument type, such as the saxophone quartet.

According to Michael Tilmouth, the repertory of quartets for wind instruments varies in instrumentation. In their divertimentos and cassations, Haydn and his contemporaries tended to combine pairs of instruments – two flutes and two horns or two clarinets with two horns, for instance. Rossini's quartets for flute, clarinet, bassoon, and horn are mostly arrangements. Franz Tausch, François René Gebauer, Nicholas Fleury, and Charles-Frederick Eler all composed works for the combination of two clarinets, horn and bassoon.

There are 20th-century works for four mixed brass and woodwind instruments by Hans Eric Apostel (Quartet in Five Movements, for flute, clarinet, bassoon, and horn, Op. 14, 1947–49), Luciano Berio, Carlos Chávez (Soli I, for oboe, clarinet, bassoon, and trumpet, 1933), Carl Ehrenberg (Quartet for oboe, clarinet, horn, and bassoon, Op. 40), and Hugo Kauder (Quartet for oboe, clarinet, horn, and bassoon).
