= C. F. E. BACH motif =

Musical motif forming C. P. E. Bach's name

C. F. E. BACH motif

The C. F. E. BACH motif is a musical motif, consisting of the notes C, F, E, B♭, A, C, B♮. The motif is a musical cryptogram, which represents the name of Carl Philipp Emanuel Bach with the initials of his name – Carl Philipp (Filippo) Emanuel Bach. The motif is based on the German note names, in which the note B♮ is named H and B♭ is named B, just as in the BACH motif. However, the initials of the composer’s name appear in a mixture of German and Italian, with Philipp rendered as Filippo.

== History ==
The C. F. E. BACH motif appears in an unpublished Fughetta in F major, by C. Ph. E. Bach himself. The composition was found in the Brussels Conservatorium by the Hungarian musicologist, Katalin Komlós in an unpublished manuscript, called Miscellanea Musica (B Bc 5895), which contains various compositional sketches, contrapunctal studies, thoroughbass exercises, modulation and chord progression schemes by Carl Philipp Emanuel Bach. This material contains a short five-part fughetta, written on the C. F. E. BACH motif, with the BACH motif also appearing in different transpositions. The volume is in the handwriting of Michel, the composer's copyist from Hamburg.

The origin of the fughetta is explained in a letter of C. Ph. E. Bach to his friend from Greifswald, Johann Heinrich Grave, dated April 28, 1784, in which the composer writes: "...Someone has recently sent me a letter, mentioning the curiosity, that not only my family name, but the letters of my first name, written in Italian – C. F. E. – are 'musical'." He continues the letter with a sketch of the fughetta in F major, based on the motif.

== Bibliography ==
- Komlós, Katalin (2015). Tanulmányok a 18. századi zene történetéből. Rózsavölgyi és Társa. ISBN 978-615-80071-7-7.
