= Musical prefix =

Prefix used in music theory

A musical prefix is a numeral or other prefix used in music theory, specifically musical tuning.

Prefix	Meaning (#)	Terms
Semi- / Half-	1/2	Semitone, halftone, semicomma, semiditone, semi-augmented (fourth), semi-diminished (fifth)
Tri-	3	Tritone, tritonic
Sept-	7	Septimal
Undec-	11	Undecimal
Tridec-	13	Tridecimal
Septen-	17	Septendecimal
Novendec-	19	Novendecimal
Milli-	1000	Millioctave
Dia-	through	Diaschisma, diatessaron, diapente, diapason
Di-	2	Diesis, ditone
En-	to make into, to put into, to get into	Enharmonic
Apo-	away, different from	Apotome
Im-	not	Imperfect (fourth)
Sesqui-	1-1/2	Sesquioctavan, sesquitertian, sesquialterate

== See also ==
- Limit (music)
- List of pitch intervals
