= Sopranissimo =

Sopranissimo (from Italian Sopra "above" and -issimo "extremely") is a term used to describe a voice, instrument or pitch higher than the sopranino range, which is itself higher than soprano. The term piccolo ("small" in Italian) is also often used for this range.

Examples include the sopranissimo ukulele, and sopranissimo recorder. The soprillo, or piccolo saxophone, is sometimes referred to as a sopranissimo.
