= Bell tone =

Imitation of a sound of the bell

A bell tone is a musical technique in which a voice or instrument is made to imitate the sound of a bell. It is characterized by a strong opening articulation followed by a rapid decay of sound.
