= Terzschritt =

Progression between specific musical chords

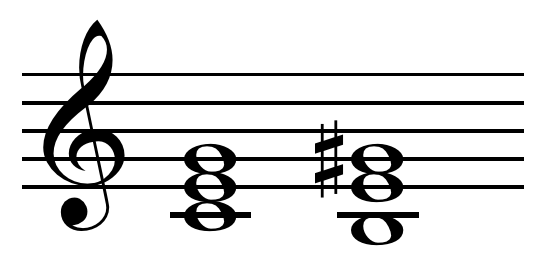
[D](Sp): CM and EM chords.

In music theory, Terzschritt (German: third step) is the progression from one major chord to another major chord, or a minor chord to another minor chord by major third root movement. Additionally, and more specifically, it is a dualistic major third relationship, in which the ascending progression from a major tonic triad to major mediant triad is equivalent to the descending one between a major tonic triad and a flat subdominant minor triad. The major chord on the mediant is itself the Terzklang (De: third chord).

"'Where is the E major chord in C major?'...a Terzschritt from the tonic....'What is the E major triad in C major?'...a Terzklang....'How does the E major triad make sense in C major?'...it functions either as III+...or as [D](SP)." The subdominant parallel (Sp) of the dominant ([D]), G, is E ([D](Sp)).

In the work of Hugo Riemann (1849-1919), inversionally related chord progressions are grouped together: the progressions C major→E major and C minor→A♭ minor belong to the same category: "Terzschritte" (see counter parallel). The first of these moves a major triad up by major third, while the second moves a minor triad down by major third, with the switch from ascending to descending motion accompanying the change from major to minor. The ascending major third progression is regarded as a "Terzschritt", while the descending progression is called "Terzwechsel." In the context of neo-Riemannian theory, this transformation is called "L-then-P". The basic transformations of neo-Riemannian theory, discussed below, all associate changes in direction with the switch from major to minor.
