= Timbre composition =

Art of creating new timbres

Timbre composition is the art of creating new timbres. It is often performed electronically, either by combining sine waves (additive synthesis) or by filtering out harmonics from more complex waves (subtractive synthesis).

== Overview ==
Timbre composition is used in vocal techniques such as throat-singing where the main focus of the music is timbre as opposed to pitch.

Music that has been composed solely using the art of Timbre composition is called Timbre-centered music.

Timbral listening is a technique used in both the composition and reception of Timbre-centered music which has been created using Timbre composition.

== Instrumentation ==
Timbre composition is significant for players of the electric guitar. The guitarist's relative proximity to his or her amplifier alters the sound produced. The sound can be modified further via equalizers, filters, and various effects pedals.

Timbre composition with acoustic instruments is usually very subtle. Minute altercations in performance change the sound produced by the instrument. Percussionists use specific sticks and mallets to yield desired timbres. Players of wind instruments alter the tone simply by changing the pressure of their lips. One could argue that the act of choosing which instrument to play or write for is in itself timbre composition.

== Notable composers ==
Notable composers working in this genre include:

- Helmut Lachenmann
- Panayiotis Kokoras
- Iancu Dumitrescu
