= Kollops =

Tuning device for a string instrument

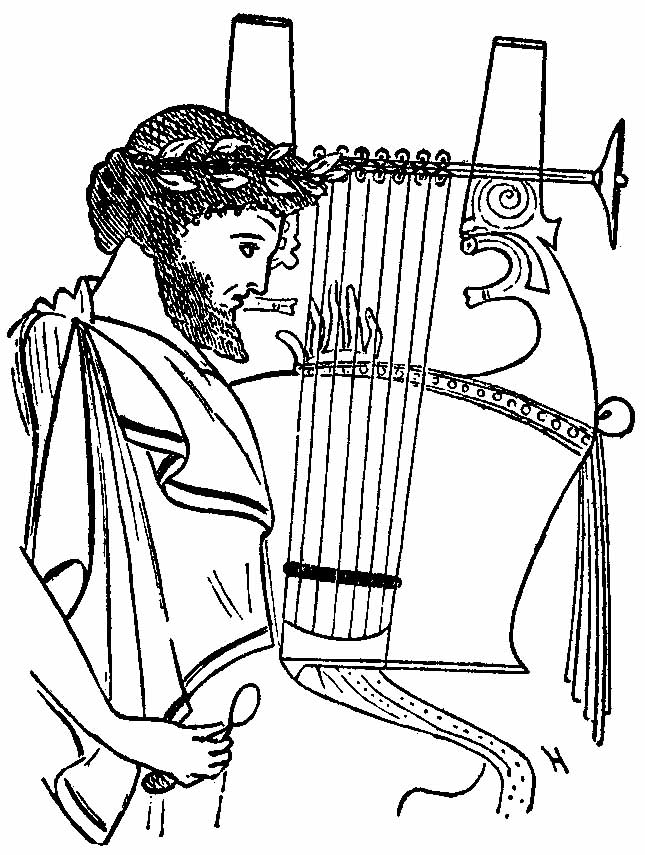
Sketch from a Greek vase, showing kollops along crossbar of a kithara

A kollops (Ancient Greek: κολλοψ or kollabos) is a tuning device for a string instrument (generally a lyre) which consists of a strip of leather wrapped around the instrument's crossbar, tightened by a wooden peg trapped in its wrap. The device is mentioned as early as the 7th century BC, used metaphorically in the Odyssey. The material itself, usually the hard material at the back of the neck of an ox, was known as "kollops" and thus the term was also used for the tuning device.

== Modern usage ==
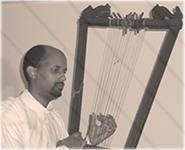
A begena, kollops seen at middle of crossbar

Though the kollops is largely obsolete, one living instrument still sometimes employing it is the Ethiopian begena lyre.

== Other uses of the term ==
The term kollops was also used in Ancient Greece as slang for an aged male prostitute, presumably by the same analogy to the hardened back neck leather of an ox.
