= Contrabassophone =

Woodwind instrument

The contrabassophone is a woodwind instrument, invented about 1847 by German bassoon maker Heinrich Joseph Haseneier. It was intended as a substitute for the contrabassoon, which at that time was an unsatisfactory instrument, with a muffled sound due to tone holes that were too small and too close together. Haseneier's design made use of some of the same principles that went into the Boehm system flute, in which keywork was developed based on tone holes with acoustically optimum sizes and positions. Another change in the Haseneier design of the contrabassophone was increasing the size of the bore to be substantially larger (by about a third) than that of the contrabassoon. This resulted in an instrument with a powerful tone. Haseneier applied for a patent for his design but was rejected. The contrabassophone was regarded as too loud for orchestral use, though it was suitable for outdoor use in military bands. Dr W.H. Stone brought a Haseneier instrument to England playing it in performances of the Handel Festival of 1871. Alfred Morton, the best English bassoon maker of the time made 3 or 4 copies of this instrument some of which included improvements in the keywork. In 1881, Morton's eldest son played one of these instrument with the Halle Orchestra. He also played it at the Crystal Palace, at Richter's concerts and at the opera. Morton made one of a higher pitch (in F) for Sir Arthur Sullivan for use in the Savoy Theatre. Following Sullivan's death, this instrument disappeared. Many other European makers produced copies of the contrabassophone, including a lightweight version made of papier-mâché.

Adolphe Fontaine-Besson patented a similar instrument in 1890 but allowed the patent to lapse in 1898. By this time the contrabassophone had been largely superseded by improved versions of the contrabassoon for orchestral use, and by the tuba in wind bands.

An instrument like those that Morton made has a range of three octaves and one tone from a low C to a high D. The fingerings are like a recorder to some degree, with a number of chromatic notes played with forked fingerings, making it quite difficult to play in keys with three or more accidentals. This could have been one of the reasons that the instrument was not played in English orchestras by the late part of the nineteenth century, instead being played in military bands such as the Coldstream, the Grenadier and the Scots Guards.
