= Brass tablature =

Brass Tablature is a rather rare form of music notation that applies to all brass instruments, but is most commonly found written for trumpet. It consists of lines with partials, and numbers representing valve or slide positions.

== Examples ==
The basic setup is shown here, with names of open notes for each partial on the left and rhythm or rhythmic notation above. The bottom line, indicating first-partial pedal tones, is not usually used by trumpet or horn. The seventh partial (B♭ on trumpet) is flat relative to equal temperament, and thus its use is also avoided. This method is impractical in the altissimo range, because of fingering differences between horns.

   1 e + a 2 e + a 3 e + a 4 e + a
9:D6______________________
8:C6______________________
7:B♭5_ _ _ _ _ _ _ _ _ _ _
6:G5______________________
5:E5______________________
4:C5______________________
3:G4______________________
2:C4______________________
1:C3 _ _ _ _ _ _ _ _ _ _ _

Numbers are used to represent fingerings. For trumpet may be seen true fingerings (0 or any combination of 1, 2, or 3) or, more commonly, positions (1, 2, 3, 4, 5, 6, 7). Trombone tablature will always have slide positions. Here is an example of a two octave C major scale for trumpet:

   1 e + a 2 e + a 3 e + a 4 e + a 1 e + a 2 e + a 3 e + a 4 e + a
9:D6________________________________________________________________
8:C6________________________________________________4___2___1_______
7:B♭5_ _ _ _ _ _ _ _ _ _ __ _ _ _ _ _ _ _ _ _ __ _ _ _ _ _ _ _ _ _ _
6:G5_________________________________________3___1__________________
5:E5_________________________________3___1__________________________
4:C5_____________________4___2___1__________________________________
3:G4_____6___4___3___1______________________________________________
2:C4_1______________________________________________________________
1:C3 _ _ _ _ _ _ _ _ _ _ __ _ _ _ _ _ _ _ _ _ __ _ _ _ _ _ _ _ _ _ _

Three-valve instruments and trombones without valves have seven possible configurations or positions. Four-valve instruments, tenor trombones with F attachments and bass trombones (potentially with multiple valves) are more complicated. The extra length of tubing utilized when instruments are extended by nearly half their length throws off the ratios of the other tubes' lengths, which were designed to produce half-steps without the extra fourth valve. Compensating euphoniums and tubas allow for this by having two sets of tubes for each of the first three valves. Non-compensating instruments and trombones must not use the third position or valve combination because it is not in tune; other combinations must be altered drastically. Some musicians prefer to extend the tablature numbering system to 12 or more; others prefer a symbol to indicate a lesser-used, longer valve. In this table, the symbol "/" is used to indicate an F-valve on the trombone or the fourth valve on a four-valved instrument.

Tablature Number	Notes for transposing instruments	Notes for concert pitch B♭ instruments	Non-compensating valved instrument fingerings	Trombone slide positions
1	C	B♭	0	1
2	B	A	2	2
3	B ♭	A♭	1	3
4	A	G	12 or 3	4
5	A♭	G♭	23	5
6 or /1	G	F	13 or 4 or /0	6 or /1
7 or /2	G♭	E	123 or 24 or /2	7 or /2
8 or /4	F	E♭	14 or /1	/4
9 or /5	E	D	124 or /12	/5
10 or /6	E♭	D♭	234 or /23	/6
11 or /7	D	C	134 or /13	/7

== See also ==
- Tablature
- Trumpet
- Brass instruments
