= Interdominant =

In music, an interdominant is a temporary dominant, the dominant of a key other than the tonic. Since a composition generally begins and ends with the tonic, the dominant of notes other than the tonic would be found in the middle.

== See also ==
- Modulation (music)
- Tonicization
