= Minor diatonic semitone =

Name
- Other names: overtone semitone

Size
- Just interval: 17:16

Cents
- Just intonation: 104.96

In music, the minor diatonic semitone is a ratio of 17:16, making it the seventeenth harmonic or partial. This is in contrast to the 5-limit major diatonic semitone of 16/15.

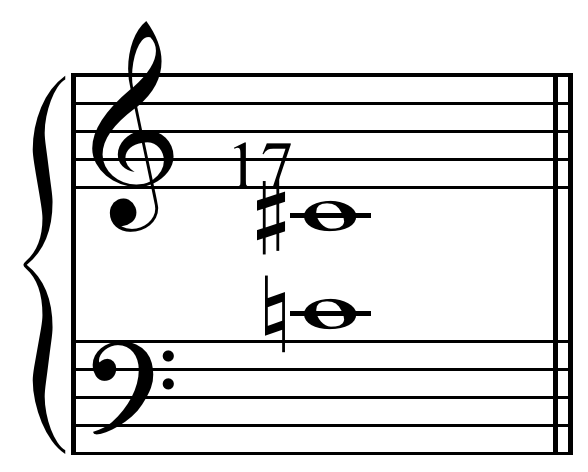
Minor diatonic semitone on C.

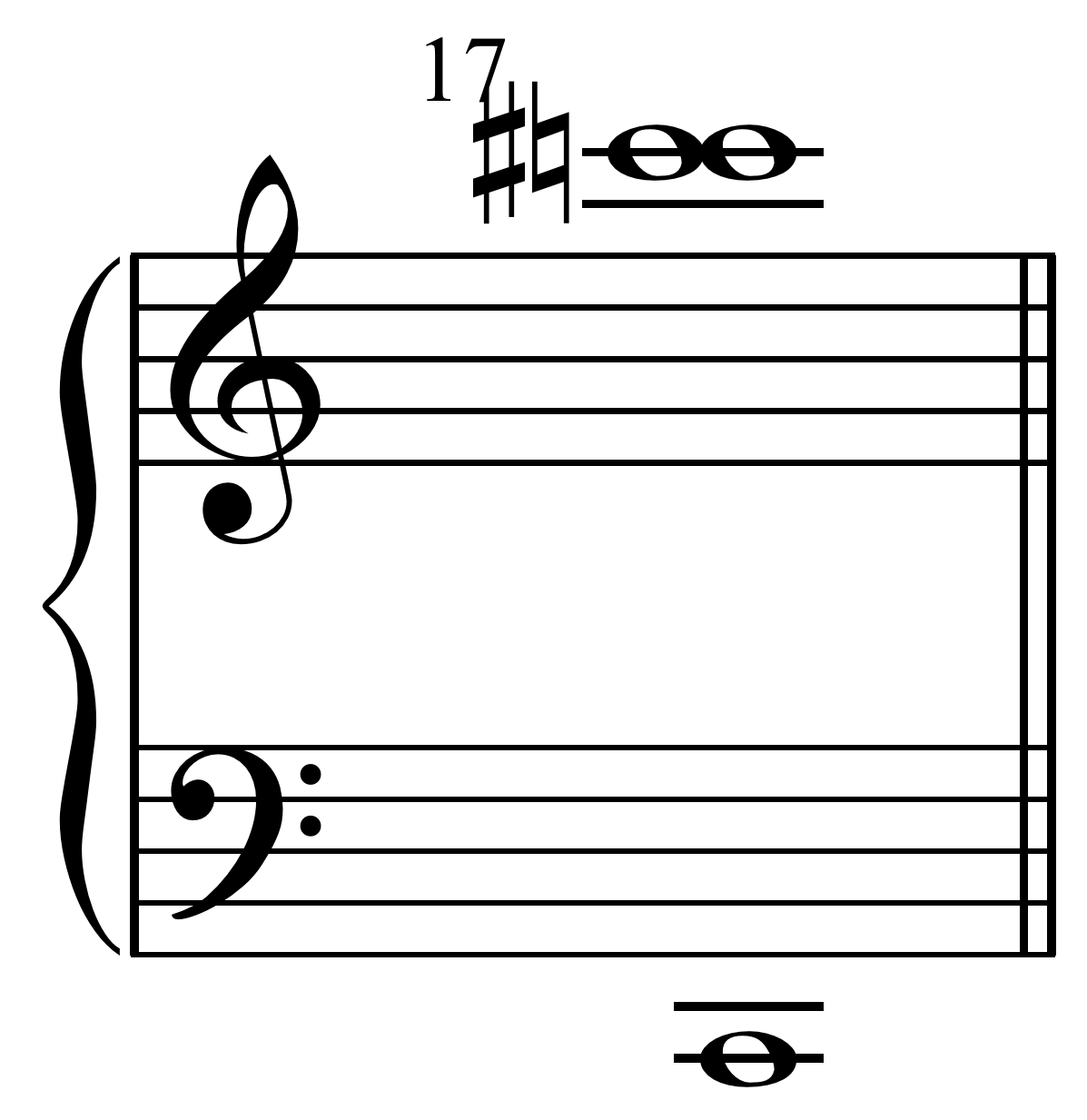
Minor diatonic semitone in the harmonic series: 1:16:17.

== See also ==
- Septimal diatonic semitone
