= Satz =

Satz (German for sentence, movement, set, setting (Note: The German word Satz may also refer to a composition's movement or the setting of music, e.g. as monodic, heterophonic, momophonic, polyphonic, or set (arranged) as a fugue or a canon.)) is any single member of a musical piece, which in and of itself displays a complete sense, (Riemann 1976: 841) such as a sentence, phrase, or movement.

== Sources ==
- Riemann (1976). Cited in Nattiez, Jean-Jacques (1990). Music and Discourse: Toward a Semiology of Music (Musicologie générale et sémiologue, 1987). Translated by Carolyn Abbate (1990). ISBN 0-691-02714-5.
