= Pensato =

Composed imaginary musical note

In music, a pensato (Italian: "thought") is a composed imaginary note, a written note which is neither played nor heard. "This meant that a note had to be so indescribably tender and soft that it was only allowed to be thought of." (Score 1958)

Anton Webern is credited by some with the first use of pensatos, while others argue he did not use them at all. As Alex Ross (2007: 69, quoted in Toop 2016: 158) puts it: "The Joke went around that Webern had introduced the marking pensato: Don't play the note, only think it." George Perle (1990:), noting that "no composer has ever been more concrete, explicit, detailed, and subtle in his notation," argues that if Webern did use a pensato, it would have been a pitch "with all the attributes that give a note actuality: pitch, duration, mode of attack and release, timbre, intensity," and not a pitch class. He also points to a "verifiable pensato" in the last bar of Alban Berg's Lyric Suite: "The instruments drop out one by one, the four parts converging into a single line that continues into an ostinato on the last two notes of the derived series and becomes inaudible on the penultimate note of the series, seemingly continuing into the silence beyond." (Perle, 1985: 14) The last measure of the score is marked "dimin.", then "morendo...*", then the asterisk reads: "*)bis zum völligen Verlöschen, daher die letzte Terz Des—F eventuell noch ein-, zweimal wiederholen. Keinesfalls aber auf Des schließen!" ("until completely extinguished, repeat the last third of Des — F once or twice. In no case, however, conclude to Des!") Presumably an expression of unrequited love (Santos 2014: 35).

== See also ==
- Ghost note
- Melodic expectation
- Niente (musical dynamic)

== Sources ==
- Lyrische Suite (1927), p.83: Scores at the International Music Score Library Project
- Perle, George (1990). The Listening Composer California: University of California Press. ISBN 978-0-520-06991-6.
- Perle, George (1985). The Operas of Alban Berg. Vol. 2: Lulu. California: University of California Press.
- Ross, Alex (2007). The Rest Is Noise: Listening to the Twentieth Century. Macmillan. ISBN 978-0-374-24939-7.
- Santos, Silvio dos (2014). Narratives of Identity in Alban Berg's 'Lulu'. Boydell & Brewer. ISBN 978-1-58046-483-3.
- Toop, David (2016). Into the Maelstrom: Music, Improvisation and the Dream of Freedom: Before 1970. Bloomsbury. ISBN 978-1-4411-0277-5.
- (1958). The Score, Issues 22-28.
