= Solita forma =

In 19th-century Italian opera, la solita forma (literally conventional form or multipartite form or double aria) is the formal design of scenes found during the bel canto era of Rossini, Bellini, Donizetti up to the late operas of Verdi. The English phrase—"multipartite form"—is most often used by American musicologist Philip Gossett, beginning with a 1974 essay, where referring to a general framework of melodramatic scene types, especially duets. Each scene gradually progresses from an opening static lyric moment to a finale through several standard musical tempos and set pieces, gradually adding characters and adding or unraveling complexity in the plot.

Because composers wrote operas in short spans of time, the standardized form of scenes ensured a time-tested dramatic and musical structure. The term itself comes from a work of criticism by Abramo Basevi

== Origins ==
Opera in the 18th century tended to emphasize solo arias with very few ensemble numbers. Faced with this state of things and wanting to achieve new dramatic situations, Rossini and his librettists experimented with ensembles to make them dramatically integral to the opera while concomitantly allowing for their lyrical expression. Because Rossini's operas dominated early 19th-century Italian opera and because his solutions to musico-dramatic situations were so successful, his works came to be regarded as models that became part of a standardized convention.

== Structural patterns ==
The form follows the basic pattern:

- Introductory music, usually instrumental
- Recitative or dialogue to an initial or basic tempo
- Adagio/ Cavatina/ "Pezzo concertato"
- "Tempo di mezzo" (middle movement, interlude, often sounds as if it is interrupting the action with entry of a third party)
- Cabaletta and (in the case of the final scene of an act),
- Finale Stretta

Large arias within the scene fall into this basic pattern. Such arias are sometimes called cavatina/cabaletta arias:

- Cantabile
- Tempo di mezzo
- Cabaletta

An example of extended solita form may be found in act 3 of Verdi's La traviata:

- Introduction: Prelude
- Recitative: "Annina? Comandate"
- Adagio: "Teneste la promessa"
- Tempo di Mezzo: offstage chorus "Largo a quadrupede"
- Cabaletta: "Signora...che t'accadde"

The form then starts over:

- Cantabile: "Parigi, o cara"
- Tempo di Mezzo: "Ah, non più....Ah, Violetta! Voi? Signor"
- Finale
