= Music of Scotland in the eighteenth century =

Robert Burns The Ayrshire Garland: Containing a Few Celebrated Songs

Music of Scotland in the eighteenth century includes all forms of music made in Scotland, by Scottish people, or in forms associated with Scotland, in the eighteenth century. Growing divisions in the Scottish kirk between the Evangelicals and the Moderate Party resulted in attempt to expand psalmonly to include hymns the singing of other scriptural paraphrases.

From the late seventeenth century Church music in the Church of Scotland consisted of the singing of psalms to a limited number of common tunes. Differences between the Evangelicals and the Moderate Party resulted in a movement to reform church music. Common practice was lining out, by which the precentor sang or read out each line and it was then repeated by the congregation. New practices were introduced and the repertory was expanded. In the second half of the eighteenth century these innovations became linked to a choir movement that included the setting up of schools to teach new tunes and singing in four parts. Published paraphrases of passages of the Bible were adopted in many parishes.

In the sixteenth and seventeenth centuries the bagpipes had replaced the harp as the most popular instrument in the Scottish Highlands. There is also evidence of adoption of the European-style fiddle. There were numerous publications of traditional tunes in the period, particularly when the oppression of secular music and dancing by the kirk began to ease, between about 1715 and 1725. In the late eighteenth century the music of the Highland bagpipes began a revival, particularly the ceòl mór (the great music), which had developed for ceremonial purposes for the Gaelic aristocracy from the seventeenth century.

The Italian style of classical music was probably first brought to Scotland by the cellist and composer Lorenzo Bocchi, who travelled to Scotland in the 1720s. By the mid-eighteenth century there were several Italians resident in Scotland, acting as composers and performers. By 1775 Edinburgh was a minor, but functioning European musical centre, with foreign and native resident composers and professional musicians. In the mid-eighteenth century a group of Scottish composers began to attempt to create their own musical tradition, creating the "Scots drawing room style". A Select Collection of Original Scottish Airs helped make Scottish songs part of the European cannon of classical music, but this championing of Scottish music associated with Robert Burns may have prevented the establishment of a tradition of European concert music in Scotland, which faltered towards the end of the century.

== Church music ==
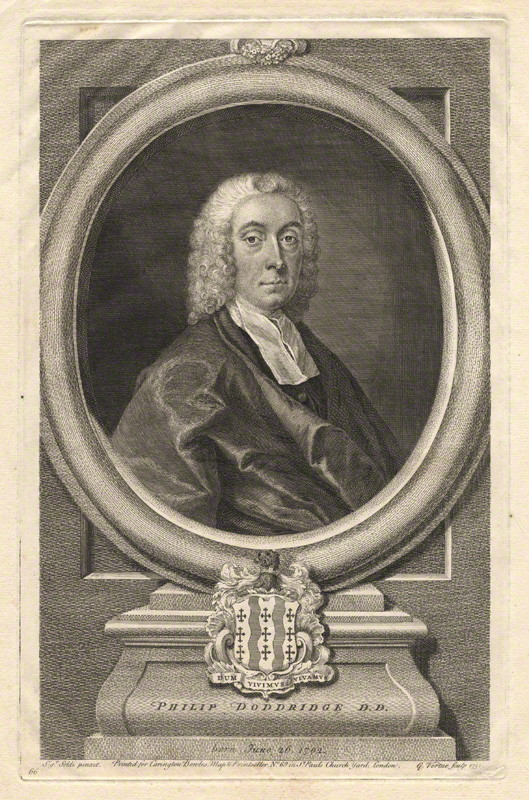
Philip Doddridge, one of the English hymnodists that had a major impact on the development of Scottish church music in the eighteenth century

In the eighteenth century there were growing divisions in the Scottish kirk between the Evangelicals and the Moderate Party. While Evangelicals emphasised the authority of the Bible and the traditions and historical documents of the kirk, the Moderates tended to stress intellectualism in theology, the established hierarchy of the kirk an attempted to raise the social status of the clergy. In music the evangelicals tended to believe only the Psalms of the 1650 Psalter should be used in the services in the church. In contrast the Moderates believed that Psalmody was in need of reform and expansion. This movement had its origins in the influence of English psalmondist and hymnodist Isaac Watts (1674–1748) and became an attempt to expand psalmondy in the Church of Scotland to include hymns the singing of other scriptural paraphrases.

From the late seventeenth century the common practice had been lining out, by which the precentor sang or read out each line and it was then repeated by the congregation. From the second quarter of the eighteenth century it was argued that this should be abandoned in favour of the practice of singing stanza by stanza. This necessitated the use of practice verses and the pioneering work was Thomas Bruce's The Common Tunes, or, Scotland's Church Musick Made Plane (1726), which contained seven practice verses. The 30 tunes in this book marked the beginning of a renewal movement in Scottish Psalmody. New practices were introduced and the repertory was expanded, including both neglected sixteenth-century settings and new ones. In the second half of the eighteenth century these innovations became linked to a choir movement that included the setting up of schools to teach new tunes and singing in four parts. More tune books appeared and the repertory further expanded, although there were still fewer than in counterpart churches in England and the US. More congregations abandoned lining out.

In the period 1742–45 a committee of the General Assembly worked on a series of paraphrases, borrowing from Watts, Philip Doddridge (1702–51) and other Scottish and English writers, which were published as Translations and Paraphrases, in verse, of several passages of Sacred Scripture (1725). These were never formally adopted, as the Moderates, then dominant in the church, thought they were too evangelical. A corrected version was licensed for private use in 1751 and some individual congregations petitioned successful for their use in public worship and they were revised again and published 1781. These were formally adopted by the assembly, but there was considerable resistance to their introduction in some parishes.

After the Glorious Revolution episcopalianism retrained supporters, but they were divided between the "non-jurors", not subscribing to the right of William III and Mary II, and later the Hanoverians, to be monarchs, and Qualified Chapels, where congregations, led by priests ordained by bishops of the Church of England or the Church of Ireland, were willing to pray for the Hanoverians. Such chapels drew their congregations from English people living in Scotland and from Scottish Episcopalians who were not bound to the Jacobite cause and used the English Book of Common Prayer. They could worship openly and installed organs and hired musicians, following practice in English parish churches, singing in the liturgy as well as metrical psalms, while the non-jurors had to worship covertly and less elaborately. The two branches united in the 1790s after the death of the last Stuart heir in the main line and the repeal of the penal laws in 1792. The non-juring branch soon absorbed the musical and liturgical traditions of the qualified churches.

== Traditional music ==
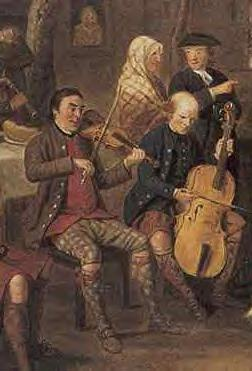
A detail from The Highland Wedding by David Allan, 1780

In the sixteenth and seventeenth centuries the bagpipes had replaced the harp as the most popular instrument in the Highlands. There is also evidence of adoption of the European style fiddle in the Highlands with Martin Martin noting in his A Description of the Western Isles of Scotland (1703) that he knew of eighteen players in Lewis alone. Well-known fiddlers included Pattie Birnie (c. 1635–1721), and later Neil (1727–1807) and his son Nathaniel Gow (1763–1831), who, along with a large number of anonymous musicians, composed hundreds of fiddle tunes and variations.

Publications early in the century included Playford's Collection of original Scotch-tunes, (full of the highland humours) for the violin (1700), Margaret Sinkler's Music Book (1710), James Watson's Choice Collection of Comic and Serious Scots Poems both Ancient and Modern 1711. The oppression of secular music and dancing by the kirk began to ease between about 1715 and 1725 and the level of musical activity was reflected in a flood musical publications in broadsheets and compendiums of music such as the makar Allan Ramsay's verse compendium The Tea Table Miscellany (1723), William Thomson's Orpheus Caledonius: or, A collection of Scots songs (1733), James Oswald's The Caledonian Pocket Companion (1751), and David Herd's Ancient and modern Scottish songs, heroic ballads, etc.: collected from memory, tradition and ancient authors (1776). These were drawn on for the most influential collection, The Scots Musical Museum published in six volumes from 1787 to 1803 by James Johnson and Robert Burns, which also included new words by Burns. A Select Collection of Original Scottish Airs collected by George Thomson and published between 1799 and 1818 included contributions from Burns and Walter Scott and contributed to the combining of Scottish traditional music with European classical forms.

In the late eighteenth century, partly as a reaction to the social upheavals of the Agricultural revolution and Highland Clearances that were seen as destroying the traditions and culture of the Highlands, the music of the Highland bagpipes began a revival. The Highland Society of London, formed in 1778, put an emphasis on bagpiping, particularly the ceòl mór (the great music), which had developed for ceremonial purposes for the Gaelic aristocracy from the seventeenth century. From 1781 the society organised ceòl mór competitions that became the basis for later gatherings in Scotland.

== Classical music ==
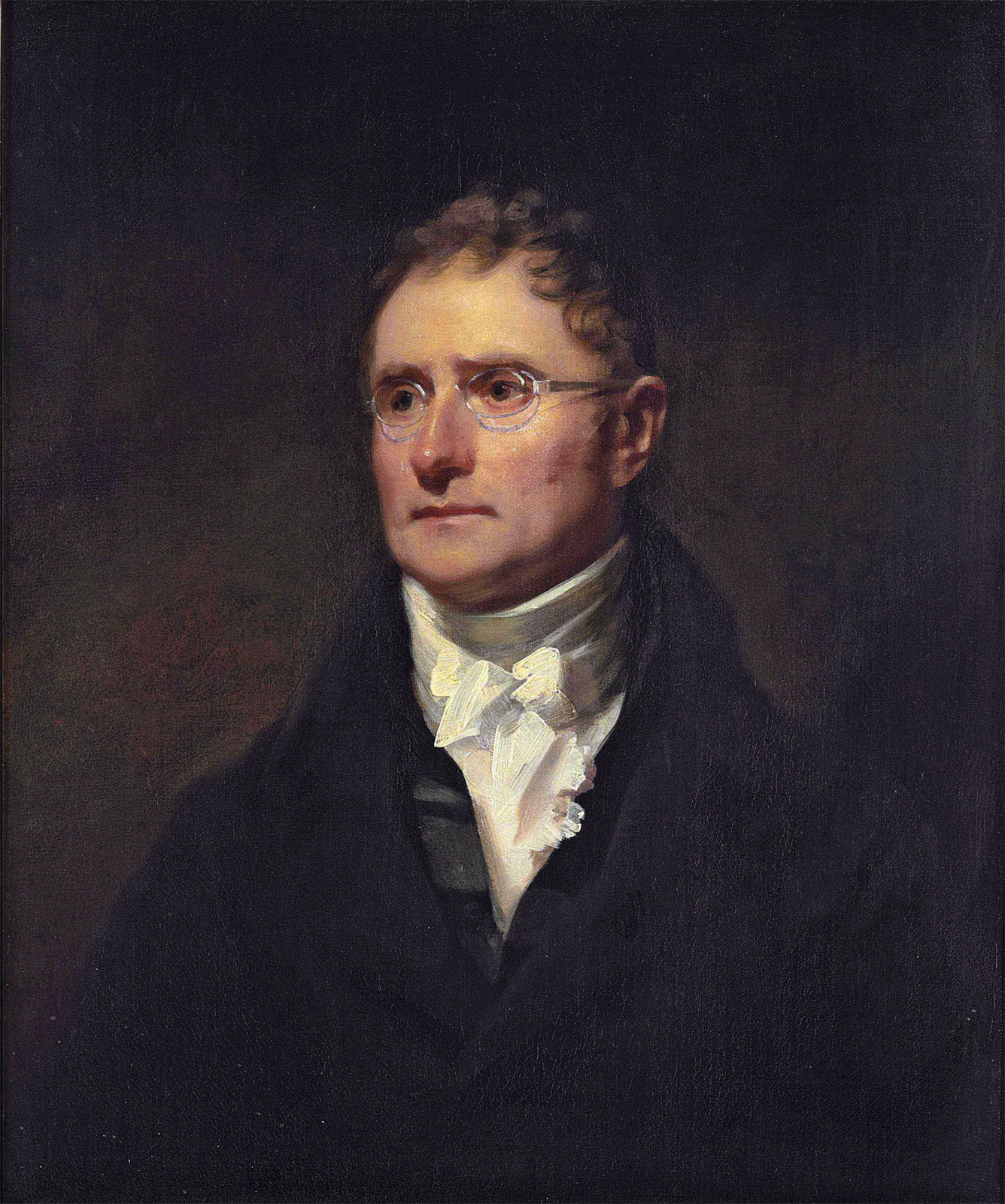
George Thomson by Henry Raeburn

The Italian style of classical music was probably first brought to Scotland by the cellist and composer Lorenzo Bocchi, who travelled to Scotland in the 1720s, introducing the cello to the country and then developing settings for Lowland Scots songs. He possibly had a hand in the first Scottish Opera, the pastoral The Gentle Shepherd (1725), with libretto by Allan Ramsay (1686–1758). The growth of a musical culture in the capital was marked by the incorporation of the Musical Society of Edinburgh in 1728 as the successor to the St. Cecilia's Society. By the mid-eighteenth century there were several Italians resident in Scotland, acting as composers and performers. These included Nicolò Pasquali, Giusto Tenducci and Fransesco Barsanti. Scottish composers known to be active in this period include Alexander Munro (fl. c. 1732), James Foulis (1710–73) and Charles McLean (fl. c. 1737). Thomas Erskine, 6th Earl of Kellie (1732–81) was one of the most important British composers of his era, and the first Scot known to have produced a symphony. The Edinburgh Musical Society was so successful in this period that it was able to build its own oval concert hall, St Cecilia's, in 1762. According to James Baxter, by 1775 Edinburgh was a minor, but functioning European musical centre, with foreign and native resident composers and professional musicians.

In the mid-eighteenth century a group of Scottish composers began to respond to Allan Ramsey's call to "own and refine" their own musical tradition, creating what James Johnson has characterised as the "Scots drawing room style", taking primarily Lowland Scottish tunes and adding simple figured basslines and other features from Italian music that made them acceptable to a middle class audience. It gained momentum when major Scottish composers like James Oswald and William McGibbon (1690–1756) became involved around 1740. Oswald's Curious Collection of Scottish Songs (1740) was one of the first to include Gaelic tunes alongside Lowland ones, setting a fashion common by the middle of the century and helping to create a unified Scottish musical identity. However, with changing fashions there was a decline in the publication of collections of specifically Scottish collections of tunes, in favour of their incorporation into British collections.

A Select Collection of Original Scottish Airs helped make Scottish songs part of the European cannon of classical music, while Thompson's work brought elements of Romanticism, such as harmonies based on those of Beethoven, into Scottish classical music. However, J. A. Baxter has suggested that Burns' championing of Scottish music may have prevented the establishment of a tradition of European concert music in Scotland, which faltered towards the end of the century. The Edinburgh Musical Society gave its last concert in 1798 and was wound up in 1801, with its concert hall sold off to become a Baptist church.
