= Pattern completion =

In music pattern completion is "the use of a projected set to organize a work over a long span of time" (Wilson 1992, p. 210n5). The compositional technique has been used by Béla Bartók and Igor Stravinsky.

== Sources ==
- Wilson, Paul (1992). The Music of Béla Bartók. ISBN 0-300-05111-5.
