= Niente =

Musical dynamic

Niente (Italian pronunciation: [ˈnjɛnte]), also called quasi niente [ˈkwaːzi ˈnjɛnte], is a musical dynamic often used at the end of a piece to direct the performer to fade the music away to little more than a bare whisper, normally gradually with a diminuendo, al niente. It is often written as "n" or "ø". It is also used to direct the performer to fade into a note without any articulation at the beginning of the note, known as dal niente (from nothing): "n".

Niente is distinct from a rest "in that [during niente] the musician is engaged in making sound, but so softly that the sound can not be heard."

== See also ==
- Ensemble Dal Niente
- Morendo
- Pensato
