= Modified Stave Notation =

System for notating music

Modified Stave Notation (MSN) is an alternative way of notating music that was developed in the UK where it is widely used. MSN is intended to be used by people who cannot easily read ordinary musical stave notation (or staff notation), even if it is enlarged, or for some people reduced in size. Such users include those with visual impairments and those who are dyslexic.

== History ==
In the 1990s the then Royal National Institute for the Blind, negotiated with the Music Publishers' Association an agreement to permit partially sighted people to enlarge music, providing only one copy was made and the enlarged music was not re-sold. For each item enlarged, permission was needed from the work's publisher who would then supply a yellow sticker with "MPA approved large print music copy RNIB" written over a five line stave. It was noted, however, at this time that enlargement produced new problems, notably with the extra space between symbols and the production of either unwieldy large and flimsy sheets or scores requiring more page turns and not necessarily in convenient places. So examples of music in which all signs equally enlarged but compacted horizontally were created.

Also in the 1990s some music publishers started producing music in large print fonts, taking layouts used widely for children's beginner tutor books and extending these to short repertoire pieces, particularly for keyboard instruments. The National Music and Disability Information Service kept a resource paper "RP14 Information on Music for People with Partial Sight" which listed some of these publishers.

With the advent of sophisticated music notation software, such as MuseScore, the production of MSN became easier, with the ability to save preferred settings of each user. The Royal National Institute of Blind People is the largest formal producer of MSN in the world, with a production team based in Ivybridge, Devon. MSN has become an accepted standard for public examinations in England and Wales, for GCSE and A level music and music technology papers, under general special arrangements authorised by the Joint Council for Qualifications, and worldwide for sight reading tests for grade examination boards such as the Associated Board of the Royal Schools of Music, and Trinity College London. Candidates requiring Modified Print copies of the rubric may ask for MSN scores, sometimes in a standard format, sometimes tailor-made to match a submitted example.

== Standards ==
Formalising standards for MSN in the UK involved:

- discussion amongst producers
- experiments with users and
- examination with software producers of the variables within packages.

The work was underpinned by links with RNIB's general print guidelines for making information accessible for blind and partially sighted people, "See it Right". Reading music notation is more complex than reading prose involving complex eye movements. Not only are there many symbols of different shapes and sizes, but the signs are placed in vertical as well as horizontal dimensions, some having effect for lines of music whilst others just apply to single features. Often the reader needs to read "in time" rather than at his or her own speed, alongside the execution of complex physical skills to render the symbols into sound via an instrument. Usually music is placed further away than ordinary print, allowing for an instrument to be placed between player and the printed music. There may also be the need to see a musical director in the middle distance. With eReading devices it is easy to obtain ordinary print consistently in one's preferred font size and type face. However, stave notation comes in all kinds of densities, type faces and relative symbols size. Modified Stave Notation can enable users to have consistent size and layout.

== Guidelines ==
Guidelines for the production of Modified Stave Notation are published by the UK Association for Accessible Formats (UKAAF) in document "G009 UKAAF Modified Stave Notation meeting individual needs for large print music".

The fundamentals of producing Modified Stave Notation are:

- clear printing of symbols with no overlapping of different signs
- evening out the symbol size and density
- reducing redundant space
- placing symbols used around the stave at a consistent distance from the lines and the notes to which they refer (so once one is located, the reader can reasonably expect to find them in the same place later in the piece), and,
- describe in words in a preface the location of sporadic or unusual symbols.

== Other factors assisting accessibility ==
In addition to the alteration of stave notation layout in MSN, other factors affecting accessibility include binding, colour of background paper (as stave notation is conventionally in black ink) and lighting. The use of multimedia can also increase accessibility. For example, the music seen can also be heard electronically with a variety of levels of "interpretation" from just the pitch and note lengths, to full nuance and stylistic detail. Lastly, analysis and development of reading and memorisation techniques, pertinent to the user's requirements, may aid fluency.

== General principles of clear print ==
Some principles from RNIB's guidelines 'See It Right' are transferred directly to stave notation in MSN. The staves and note stem thickness correspond to a thickness of letters in 16 point typefaces. Spaces between systems and between staves within a system are sufficiently large, although more use is made of left and right margins. Text is sans serif, semi-bold or bold.

== Other modifications ==
Numerals are used in music for all kinds of purposes: in MSN page numbers are distinguished from bar numbers, by being placed in circles, for example. In MSN the use of full size numerals for fingering rather than subscript size is a particular feature. Fingering numbers are also often placed in a horizontal line rather than dipping up and down to follow the contour of the melody, enabling a user to memorise the melody and then just follow the fingering numbers.

The need for text to follow easily from column to column, page to page, is especially important in MSN where page turns need to occur where possible at a place where there are rests or at least at suitable musical breaks. Many users of modified print materials read them with additional technological help, such as a closed circuit television screen: for this, the pages need to be able to lie flat. Much music is written in portrait format, whereas landscape is preferred for MSN to reduce the number of times the reader has to track back to the beginning of a new system.

MSN using music notation software enables dyslexic and partially sighted people who struggle to use the huge variety of formats of stave notation to have their music produced in a consistent layout, according to certain conventions, allowing more fluent use.
