= Divisi =

Term in musical notation

In musical terminology, divisi, or as typically printed “div.,” is an instruction to divide a single section of instruments into multiple subsections. This usually applies to the violins of the string section in an orchestra, although violas, cellos, and double basses can also be divided. Typically, 4-part French horn sections include divided sections if horns 1/2 and/or 3/4 are not playing the same music ("a2"). Other brass instruments can also be divided but it is not as frequent as with the horn section. Woodwinds - especially flutes and clarinets - also utilize "divisi" to divide music between parts and even between players of the same part.

After a divisi section, it may be cancelled by the instructions tutti, all'unisono. or unison (abbreviated unis.).

The German equivalents for divisi and tutti, often used in German language scores, are geteilt (or getheilt, abbreviated get.) and zusammen (abbreviated zus.).

Some pieces use notation that refers to half of a section or referring to a specific number of performers. For instance, Giuseppe Verdi's scores include directions for small sections of the chorus by metà ("half") or soli quattro soprani ("four sopranos alone"). Some German late Romantic scores use instructions like die eine Hälfte/die andere Hälfte ("one half" and "the other half").
