= Bologna School of music =

17th-century group of Bologna composers

Bologna School is a term for the group of composers active in Bologna in the mid-late 17th century; most were associated with the church of Saint Petronius or the Accademia Filarmonica. They include Cazzati, Perti, G. B. Vitali, Torelli and Corelli (who had Bolognese links although he mainly worked in Rome); the school is associated with sacred music and particularly with the rise of the instrumental concerto and sonata, including music for trumpet and strings, a Bolognese speciality.
