= Sopranino voice =

High range singing voice

Sopranino refers to a singing voice that is higher than soprano. It typically refers to a range of about E_{4} to E_{6}, sometimes extending as high as G_{6}, even an A_{6}. A sopranino voice type is rare. It is not considered a classical music part, nor a popular name, but would be cast as a high soprano.

Sopranino voice range (E_{4}–E_{6}) indicated on piano keyboard in green with dot marking middle C (C_{4}).
