= Ditonic scale =

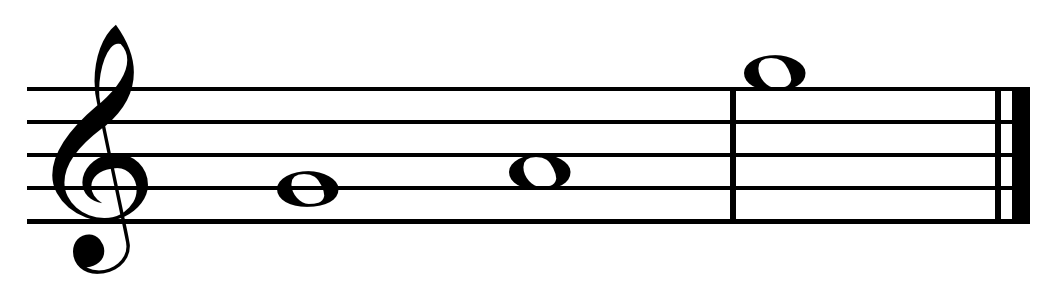
Example of a ditonic scale.

A ditonic scale is a musical scale or mode with two notes per octave. This is in contrast to a heptatonic (seven-note) scale such as the major scale and minor scale, or a dodecatonic (chromatic 12-note ) scale, both common in modern Western music. Ethnomusicologist Bruno Nettl noted that ditonic scales were common in many parts of the world but often limited to specific music types, such as children's songs, with the exception of some tribal societies.

== Distribution ==
=== Russia ===
The Cheremis (Mari people) of Russia employ ditonic scales in children's songs, generally with the two notes a minor third apart. Nettl theorised that these ditonic songs may be a remnant of a more archaic form of music.

=== Peru ===
The Shipibo people of Amazonian Peru used ditonic scales in approximately 2.5% of their music. The ditonic was found "almost exclusively in the complex ostinato songs."

=== Vietnam ===
The ca dao folk poetry of Vietnam is sometimes sung in ditonic scales.

=== North America ===
Several ditonic scales were noted about the Modoc and Klamath tribes of the North American West Coast, and are also found in the Great Plains in the rituals of the 1800s Ghost Dance religion. The scale was also used in the music of the Shawnee.

=== India ===
The ditonic scale type is recognised in Indian music, and termed the Dvisvara ("two tone"), but ditonic scales are not recognised as raga scales.

=== Nigeria ===
The ditonic is among the scale types employed in traditional Nigerian music.

=== Maori ===
In a study carried out in 1969, Mervyn McLean noted that among the Maori tribes he surveyed, ditonic scales comprised 17% of the scales used.
