= Key signature names and translations =

Translation of musical keys

When a musical key or key signature is referred to in a language other than English, that language may use the usual notation used in English (namely the letters A to G, along with translations of the words sharp, flat, major and minor in that language): languages which use the English system include Irish, Welsh, Hindi, Japanese (based on katakana in iroha order), Korean (based on hangul in ganada order), Chinese, Thai, Indonesian, Filipino, Swahili, Esperanto.

Or it may use some different notation. Two notation systems are most commonly found beside the English system, the Fixed Do key notation and the German key notation

1. Fixed Do key notation – used (among others) in Italian, French, Dutch (in the Dutch-speaking part of Belgium), Spanish, Portuguese, Catalan, Occitan, Breton, Basque, Russian (along with the German system), Ukrainian, Belarusian, Bulgarian, Latvian, Lithuanian (along with the German and English system), Romanian, Greek, Hebrew, Arabic, Persian, Turkish (along with the English system) and Vietnamese. Most countries (though not all, e.g. Serbia) where Fixed Do solmization is used also use the Fixed Do key notation. Instead of the letters C, D, E, F, G, A, B, seven syllables (derived from solfege) are used to refer to the seven diatonic tones of C major: Do (in French Do or Ut), Re, Mi, Fa, Sol (never So), La, Si (never Ti), with some variations and adaptations according to country, language and alphabet, followed by the accidental (natural is clearly most often omitted) and then the major/minor qualifier as needed.
2. German key notation – used (among others) in German, Dutch (in the Netherlands, where it is used along with the English system), Danish, Swedish, Norwegian, Icelandic, Finnish, Estonian, Serbian (along with the English system), Croatian, Bosnian, Slovene, Hungarian, Polish, Czech and Slovak. The German key notation differs from the English system in two respects, namely that B♮ is referred to by the letter H and B♭ by the letter B by itself, and that sharp and flat designations do not use words but suffix is for sharps and suffix es (reduced to s if the tone letter is a vowel) for flats, except that (as already mentioned) in the German system the letter B by itself already means B flat. However, in some places where the German system is in use one may encounter the use of B for B♮ and Bes for B♭. This is especially common in the Netherlands.

There has been a tendency in some countries that historically used the Fixed Do key notation or the German key notation to switch to the English system, especially among musicians working in popular music genres or jazz. The only case where this can lead to some confusion is when the letter B is used because it would not be clear whether the intention was for it to be understood as B♮ (English system) or B♭ (German system). Another tendency has been to use the English system in writing but to read it out according to either the Fixed Do or the German system if those are the systems used locally. For example, recent French scores or books may use the English system (this is especially common for chord symbols), but French users would read out that notation according to the Fixed Do system. Similarly, a Dutch musician may refer to a written F♯ orally as Fis. This article is concerned with written usage.

To form a key designation, locate the note name in the pitch translation table and add the major/minor qualifier from the lower table as needed.

Pitch translation table
alphabetic systems						solmization systems											
English	German	Dutch (Netherlands)	Japanese	Chinese	Korean	Arabic	Persian	Hebrew	Italian	French	Spanish	Portuguese	Russian	Romanian	Dutch (Belgium)	Greek	Lithuanian
C flat	Ces	Ces	変ハ (hen-ha)	降C (jiàng-C)	내림 다 (naerim da)	دو-بيمول (Do-bemol)	دو بمل (Do Bemol)	דוֹ בֵּמוֹל (Do Bemol)	Do bemolle	Do bémol	Do bemol	Dó bemol	До-бемоль (Do-bemol)	Do bemol	Do mol	Ντο ύφεση (Do hyphesis)	Do bemol
C	C	C	ハ (ha)	C	다 (da)	دو (Do)	دو (Do)	דוֹ (Do)	Do	Do (Ut)	Do	Dó	До (Do)	Do	Do	Ντο (Do)	Do
C sharp	Cis	Cis	嬰ハ (ei-ha)	升C (shēng-C)	올림 다 (ollim da)	دو-دييز (Do-diez)	دو دیز (Do Diez)	דוֹ דִּיאֵז (Do Diez)	Do diesis	Do dièse	Do sostenido	Dó sustenido	До-диез (Do-diez)	Do diez	Do kruis	Ντο δίεση (Do diesis)	Do diez
D flat	Des	Des	変ニ (hen-ni)	降D (jiàng-D)	내림 라 (naerim ra)	ري-بيمول (Re-bemol)	ر بمل (Re Bemol)	רֶה בֵּמוֹל (Re Bemol)	Re bemolle	Ré bémol	Re bemol	Ré bemol	Ре-бемоль (Re-bemol)	Re bemol	Re mol	Ρε ύφεση (Re hyphesis)	Re bemol
D	D	D	ニ (ni)	D	라 (ra)	ري (Re)	ر (Re)	רֶה (Re)	Re	Ré	Re	Ré	Ре (Re)	Re	Re	Ρε (Re)	Re
D sharp	Dis	Dis	嬰ニ (ei-ni)	升D (shēng-D)	올림 라 (ollim ra)	ري-دييز (Re-diez)	ر دیز (Re Diez)	רֶה דִּיאֵז (Re Diez)	Re diesis	Ré dièse	Re sostenido	Ré sustenido	Ре-диез (Re-diez)	Re diez	Re kruis	Ρε δίεση (Re diesis)	Re diez
E flat	Es	Es	変ホ (hen-ho)	降E (jiàng-E)	내림 마 (naerim ma)	مي-بيمول (Mi-bemol)	می بمل (Mi Bemol)	מִי בֵּמוֹל (Mi Bemol)	Mi bemolle	Mi bémol	Mi bemol	Mi bemol	Ми-бемоль (Mi-bemol)	Mi bemol	Mi mol	Μι ύφεση (Mi hyphesis)	Mi bemol
E	E	E	ホ (ho)	E	마 (ma)	مي (Mi)	می (Mi)	מִי (Mi)	Mi	Mi	Mi	Mi	Ми (Mi)	Mi	Mi	Μι (Mi)	Mi
E sharp	Eis	Eis	嬰ホ (ei-ho)	升E (shēng-E)	올림 마 (ollim ma)	مي-دييز (Mi-diez)	می دیز (MI Diez)	מִי דִּיאֵז (Mi Diez)	Mi diesis	Mi dièse	Mi sostenido	Mi sustenido	Ми-диез (M-diez)	Mi diez	Mi kruis	Μι δίεση (Mi diesis)	Mi diez
F flat	Fes	Fes	変ヘ (hen-he)	降F (jiàng-F)	내림 바 (naerim ba)	فا-بيمول (Fa-bemol)	فا بمل (Fa Bemol)	פַה בֵּמוֹל (Fa Bemol)	Fa bemolle	Fa bémol	Fa bemol	Fá bemol	Фа-бемоль (Fa-bemol)	Fa bemol	Fa mol	Φα ύφεση (Fa hyphesis)	Fa bemol
F	F	F	ヘ (he)	F	바 (ba)	فا (Fa)	فا (Fa)	פַה (Fa)	Fa	Fa	Fa	Fá	Фа (Fa)	Fa	Fa	Φα (Fa)	Fa
F sharp	Fis	Fis	嬰ヘ (ei-he)	升F (shēng-F)	올림 바 (ollim ba)	فا-دييز (Fa-diez)	فا دیز (Fa Diez)	פַה דִּיאֵז (Fa Diez)	Fa diesis	Fa dièse	Fa sostenido	Fá sustenido	Фа-диез (Fa diez)	Fa diez	Fa kruis	Φα δίεση (Fa diesis)	Fa diez
G flat	Ges	Ges	変ト (hen-to)	降G (jiàng-G)	내림 사 (naerim sa)	صول-بيمول (Sol-bemol)	سول بمل (Sol Bemol)	סוֹל בֵּמוֹל (Sol Bemol)	Sol bemolle	Sol bémol	Sol bemol	Sol bemol	Соль-бемоль (Sol-bemol)	Sol bemol	Sol mol	Σολ ύφεση (Sol hyphesis)	Sol bemol
G	G	G	ト (to)	G	사 (sa)	صول (Sol)	سول (Sol)	סוֹל (Sol)	Sol	Sol	Sol	Sol	Соль (Sol)	Sol	Sol	Σολ (Sol)	Sol
G sharp	Gis	Gis	嬰ト (ei-to)	升G (shēng-G)	올림 사 (ollim sa)	صول-دييز (Sol-diez)	سول دیز (Sol Diez)	סוֹל דִּיאֵז (Sol Diez)	Sol diesis	Sol dièse	Sol sostenido	Sol sustenido	Соль-диез (Sol-diez)	Sol diez	Sol kruis	Σολ δίεση (Sol diesis)	Sol diez
A flat	As	As	変イ (hen-i)	降A (jiàng-A)	내림 가 (naerim ga)	لا-بيمول (la-bemol)	لا بمل (La Bemol)	לַה בֵּמוֹל (La Bemol)	La bemolle	La bémol	La bemol	Lá bemol	Ля-бемоль (Lja-bemol)	La bemol	La mol	Λα ύφεση (La hyphesis)	Lia bemol
A	A	A	イ (i)	A	가 (ga)	لا (La)	لا (La)	לַה (La)	La	La	La	Lá	Ля (Lja)	La	La	Λα (La)	Lia
A sharp	Ais	Ais	嬰イ (ei-i)	升A (shēng-A)	올림 가 (ollim ga)	لا-دييز (La-diez)	لا دیز (La Diez)	לַה דִּיאֵז (La Diez)	La diesis	La dièse	La sostenido	Lá sustenido	Ля-диез (Lja-diez)	La diez	La kruis	Λα δίεση (La diesis)	Lia diez
B flat	B	Bes	変ロ (hen-ro)	降B (jiàng-B)	내림 나 (naerim na)	سي-بيمول (Si-bemol)	سی بمل (Si Bemol)	סִי בֵּמוֹל (Si Bemol)	Si bemolle	Si bémol	Si bemol	Si bemol	Си-бемоль (Si-bemol)	Si bemol	Si mol	Σι ύφεση (Si hyphesis)	Si bemol
B	H	B	ロ (ro)	B	나 (na)	سي (Si)	سی (Si)	סִי (Si)	Si	Si	Si	Si	Си (Si)	Si	Si	Σι (Si)	Si
B sharp	His	Bis	嬰ロ (ei-ro)	升B (shēng-B)	올림 나 (ollim na)	سي-دييز (Si-diez)	سی دیز (Si Diez)	סִי דִּיאֵז (Si Diez)	Si diesis	Si dièse	Si sostenido	Si sustenido	Си-диез (Si-diez)	Si diez	Si kruis	Σι δίεση (Si diesis)	Si diez

Major/minor alteration
English	Arabic	German	Dutch	Japanese	Chinese	Korean	Italian	French	Spanish	Persian	Hebrew	Portuguese	Russian	Romanian	Greek	Lithuanian
major	الكبير (alkabeer)	Dur	groot, grote terts	長調 (chōchō)	大調 (dà-diào)	장조 (jangjo)	maggiore	majeur	mayor	ماژور (Mažor)	מָאז'וֹר (Major)	maior	мажор	major	μείζονα	mažoras/dur
minor	الصغير (alsagheer)	Moll	klein, kleine terts	短調 (tanchō)	小調 (xiǎo-diào)	단조 (danjo)	minore	mineur	menor	مینور (Minor)	מִינוֹר (Minor)	menor	минор	minor	ελάσσονα	minoras/moll

The 'major' alteration is usually superfluous, as a key description missing an alteration is invariably assumed to be major.

In the German notation scheme, a hyphen is added between the pitch and the alteration (D-Dur).

In German, Dutch, and Lithuanian, the minor key signatures are written with a lower case letter (d-Moll, d klein, d kleine terts).

For example, to describe a piece composed in the key of F-sharp major, one could say:

- F-sharp major (English)
- فا-دييز الكبير (fa-diez alkabeer) (Arabic)
- פַה דִּיאֵז מָאז'וֹר (Fa diez major) (Hebrew)
- Fis-Dur (German)
- Fis groot (Dutch; The Netherlands)
- 升F大調 (shēng-F dà-diào) (Chinese)
- 嬰ヘ長調 (ei-he chōchō) (Japanese)
- 올림 바 장조 (ollim ba jangjo) (Korean)
- Fa diesis maggiore (Italian)
- Fa dièse majeur (French)
- Fa sostenido mayor (Spanish)
- Fá sustenido maior (Portuguese)
- Фа-диез мажор (Russian)
- Fa diez major (Romanian)
- Fa kruis groot (Dutch; Belgium)
- Φα δίεση μείζονα (Greek)
- Fa diez mažoras/Fis-dur (Lithuanian)

Another example, to describe a piece composed in the key of E-flat minor, one could say:

- E-flat minor (English)
- مي-بيمول الصغير (mi-bemol alsagheer) (Arabic)
- מִי בֵּמוֹל מִינוֹר (Mi bemol minor) (Hebrew)
- es-Moll (German)
- es klein (Dutch; The Netherlands)
- 降E小調 (jiàng-E xiǎo-diào) (Chinese)
- 変ホ短調 (hen-ho tanchō) (Japanese)
- 내림 마 단조 (naerim ma danjo) (Korean)
- Mi bemolle minore (Italian)
- Mi bémol mineur (French)
- Mi bemol menor (Spanish)
- Mi bemol menor (Portuguese)
- Ми-бемоль минор (Russian)
- Mi bemol minor (Romanian)
- Mi mol klein (Dutch; Belgium)
- Μι ύφεση ελάσσονα (Greek)
- Mi bemol minoras/es-moll (Lithuanian)
