= Dromoi =

Dromoi (Greek: δρόμοι "ways"; singular: δρόμος) is the word for a melody type of the Greek music system.

In Greek music theory, dromoi is not only characterized by a sequence of phonemes, but also individual characteristics such as specific sounds that attract the neighboring sounds and concrete ways to jump from one dromos to another. These apply in general and on the way of rebetiko music.
