= Woodwind quartet =

Musical ensemble with four woodwinds

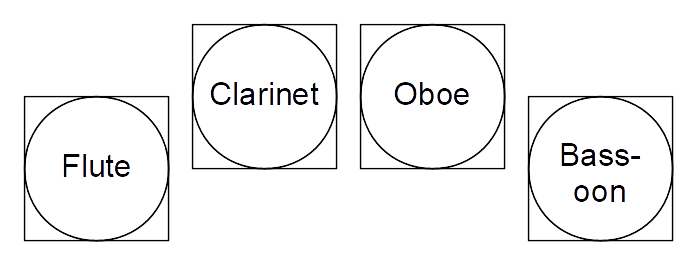
Ensemble layout

A woodwind quartet is a musical ensemble for four woodwind instruments. Alternatively, the term refers to music composed for this ensemble. The most common scoring is flute, oboe, clarinet and bassoon. The ensemble is also often used as a teaching ensemble in schools and universities and as a concertino group in a concerto grosso.

== Sound ==
The woodwind quartet contains four instruments from different subgroups of the woodwind family. This gives the ensemble a wide range with different timbres in different ranges. The flute and oboe provide the high tones, the bassoon the low tones, and the clarinet both the high and low tones. Despite its timbral variety, the available repertoire for this ensemble is smaller compared to other chamber music ensembles. One reason is that the instrumentation of a woodwind quartet resembles that of a woodwind quintet, which has a larger repertoire.

== Roles ==
Since the professional repertoire for this ensemble is limited, few professional woodwind quartets exist. The woodwind quartet, as well as chamber music as a whole, is commonly used as an educational ensemble in schools and universities. Many works for the ensemble exist at varying difficulties, allowing for musicians of different skills to participate in the ensemble. Works for the woodwind quartet that are often performed are Heitor Villa-Lobos' Quartet (1928) and Elliot Carter's Eight Etudes and a Fantasy (1950). Some composers have also added the piano or harp to the woodwind quartet, such as Franz Danzi in his Quintet in F major, Op. 53.

In addition to its use as a chamber ensemble, the woodwind quartet may function as a concertino group in a concerto grosso. Examples are the Quadruple Concerto for woodwind quartet and orchestra (1935) by Jean Françaix, and the Concerto Grosso for woodwind quartet and wind ensemble (1959) by Heitor Villa-Lobos. Paul Hindemith added a harp to the woodwind quartet in his Concerto for flute, oboe, clarinet, bassoon, harp, and orchestra (1949).

== Woodwind quartet repertoire ==
=== 20th century ===
- Karl Goepfart (1859–1942), Wind Quartet in D minor, Op. 93 (1907)
- Heitor Villa-Lobos (1887–1959), Quartet, for flute, oboe, clarinet, and bassoon (1928)
- Jean René Désiré Françaix (1912–1997), Quartet for winds (1933)
- Frank Bridge (1879–1941), Divertimenti (Prelude, Nocturne, Scherzetto, and Bagatelle) (1934–1938)
- Arthur Berger (1912–2003), Quartet for Winds in C Major (1941)
- Jesús Bal y Gay (1905–1993), Divertimento para cuatro instrumentos de viento (1942)
- Elliott Carter (1908–2012), Eight Etudes and a Fantasy for woodwind quartet (1950)
- Milton Babbitt (1916–2011), Woodwind Quartet (1953)
- Tadeusz Baird (1928–1981), Divertimento for flute, oboe, clarinet & bassoon (1956)
- Mario Davidovsky (born 1934), Three Pieces for woodwind quartet (1956)
- Nancy Van de Vate (1930–2023), Woodwind Quartet (1964)
- Steven R. Gerber (born 1948), Woodwind Quartet (1967)
- Gloria Coates (1938–2023), Five Abstractions of the Poems by Emily Dickinson, for woodwind quartet (1975)

=== 21st century ===
- Michael Edward Edgerton (born 1961), le Critérion, for woodwind quartet (2000/2008)
- David Carlson (born 1952), Woodwind Quartet (Flute, Oboe, Clarinet, Bassoon) (2010)
- Pablo Kunik (born 1970), Aires de Buenos Aires, Opus 1 (Flute, Oboe, Clarinet, Bassoon) (2019)
- Ricardo Matosinhos (born 1982), Suite Açaí (Flute, Oboe, Clarinet, Bassoon) (2016)

== Notable wind quartets ==
- Tetrawind
