= Tritonic scale =

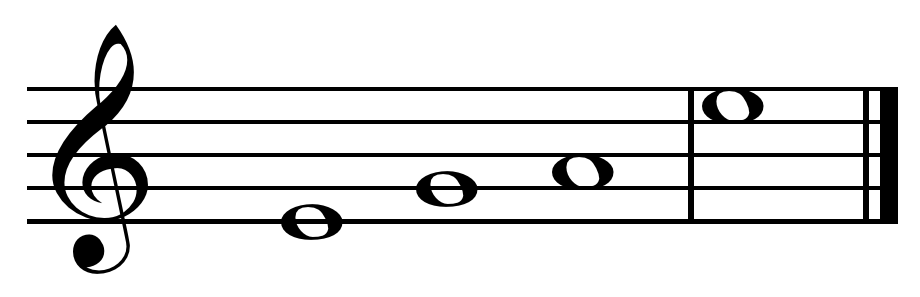
Example tritonic scale.

A tritonic scale is a musical scale or mode with three notes per octave. This is in contrast to a heptatonic (seven-note) scale such as the major scale and minor scale, or a dodecatonic (chromatic 12-note) scale, both common in modern Western music. Tritonic scales are not common in modern art music, and are generally associated with indigenous and prehistoric music.

== Distribution ==
=== India ===
Early Indian Rig Vedic hymns were tri-tonic, sung in three pitches with no octave: Udatta, Anudatta, and Swarita.

=== Maori ===
In a 1969 study, Mervyn McLean noted that tritonic scales were the most common among the Maori tribes he surveyed, comprising 47% of the scales used.

=== South America ===
The pre-Hispanic herranza ritual music of the Andes is generally tritonic, based on a major triad, and played on the waqra phuku trumpet, violin, and singer with a tinya drum. The tritonic scale is largely limited to this ritual and to some southern Peruvian Carnival music.

== See also ==
- One-third octave
- Tritone
