= Bisector (music) =

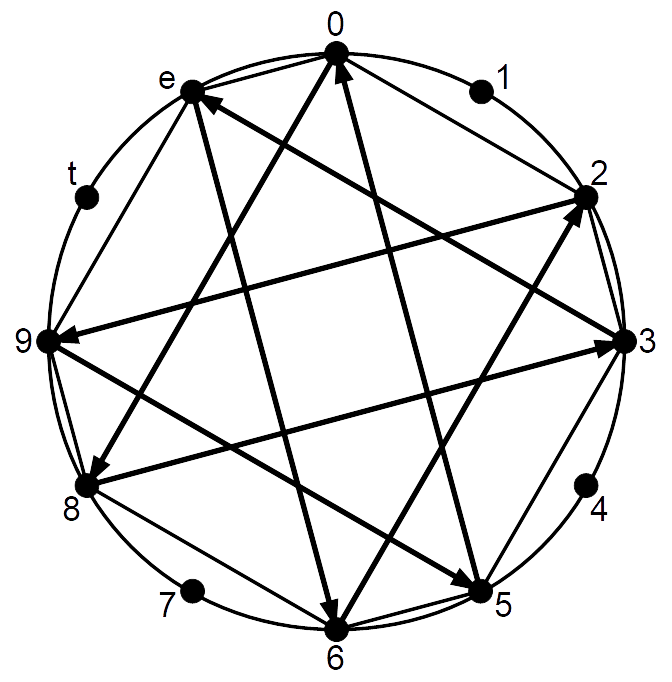
Octatonic scale produced by a chain or circle of bisectors

For comparison, the chromatic scale produced by an aliquant bisector or generator, the perfect fifth, creating a circle of fifths

In diatonic set theory, a bisector divides the octave approximately in half (the equal tempered tritone is exactly half the octave) and may be used in place of a generator to derive collections for which structure implies multiplicity is not true such as the ascending melodic minor, harmonic minor, and octatonic scales. Well formed generated collections generators and bisectors coincide, such as the perfect fifth (circle of fifths) in the diatonic collection. The term was introduced by Jay Rahn (1977), who considers any division between one and two thirds as approximately half (major third to minor sixth or 400 to 800 cents) and who applied the term only the equally spaced collections. Clough and Johnson both adapt the term to apply to generic scale steps. Rahn also uses aliquant bisector for bisectors which may be used to generate every note in a collection, in which case the bisector and the number of notes must be coprime. Bisectors may be used to produce the diatonic, harmonic minor, and ascending melodic minor collections. (Johnson 2003, p. 97, 101, 158n10-12)

The diatonic scale may be derived from a chain of perfect fifths:

 P5 P5 P5 P5 P5 P5
F  C  G  D  A  E  B = C  D  E  F  G  A  B  C.
5, 0, 7, 2, 9, 4, e = 0, 2, 4, 5, 7, 9, e, 0.
 +7 +7 +7 +7 +7 +7 (mod 12)

For example, the octatonic scale may be derived similarly to derivations of the diatonic scale by a chain of perfect fifths (a generator), by using a bisector of 5 scale steps (3 may also be used). However, five steps in the octatonic scale alternates between 7 and 8 semitones, so it is a bisector and not a generator:

 A5 P5 A5 P5 A5 P5 A5 P5
C  A♭ E♭ B  G♭ D  A  F  C = C  D  E♭ F  G♭ A♭ A  B  C.
0, 8, 3, e, 6, 2, 9, 5, 0 = 0, 2, 3, 5, 6, 8, 9, e, 0.
 +8 +7 +8 +7 +8 +7 +8 +7

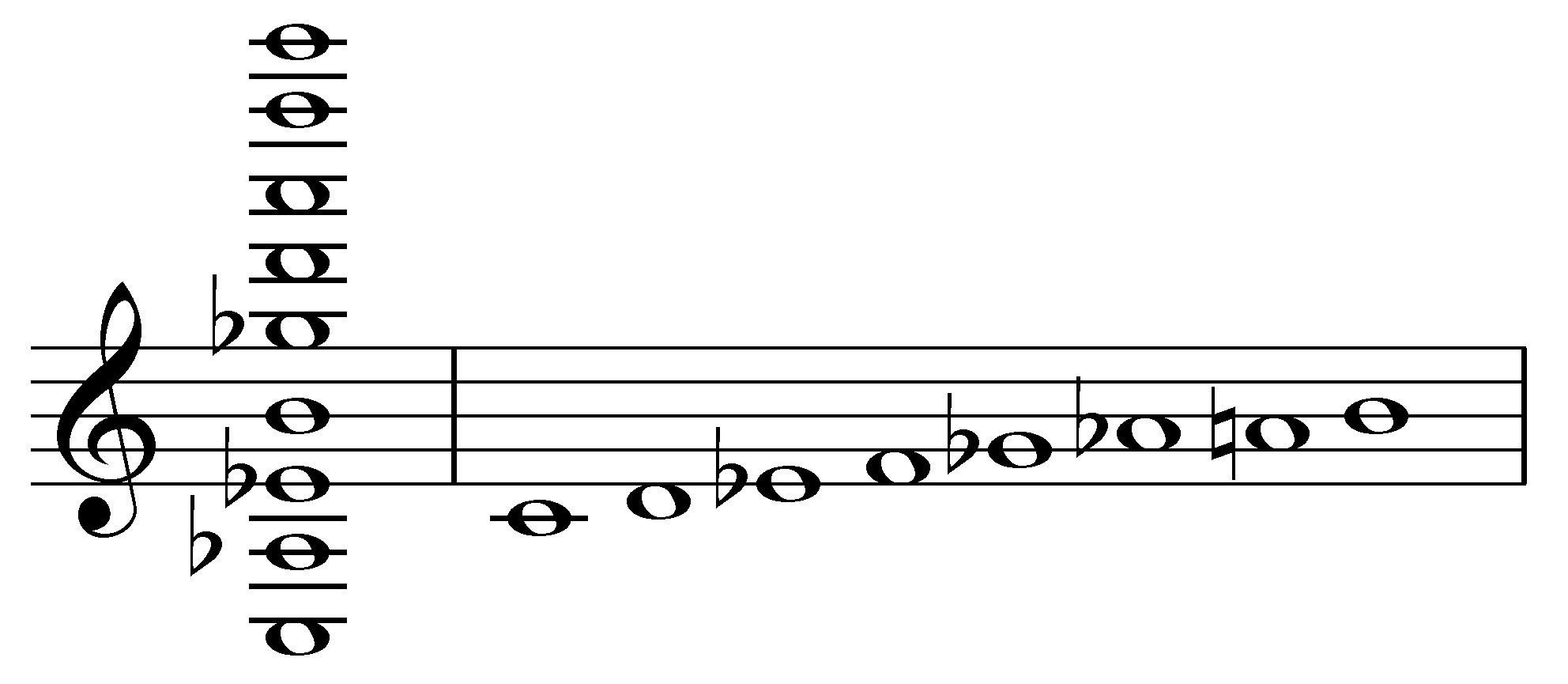
