= Diatonic set theory =

Application of musical set theory to the diatonic scale

Diatonic set theory is a subdivision or application of musical set theory which applies the techniques and analysis of discrete mathematics to properties of the diatonic collection such as maximal evenness, Myhill's property, well formedness, the deep scale property, cardinality equals variety, and structure implies multiplicity. The name is something of a misnomer as the concepts involved usually apply much more generally, to any periodically repeating scale.

Music theorists working in diatonic set theory include Eytan Agmon, Gerald J. Balzano, Norman Carey, David Clampitt, John Clough, Jay Rahn, and mathematician Jack Douthett. A number of key concepts were first formulated by David Rothenberg (the Rothenberg propriety), who published in the journal Mathematical Systems Theory, and Erv Wilson, working entirely outside of the academic world.

== See also ==
- Bisector
- Diatonic and chromatic
- Generic and specific intervals
