= Common tone (scale) =

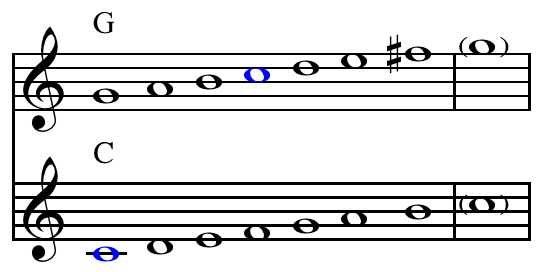
C is a common tone between the C and G major scales, as are D, E, G, A, and B.

In music, a common tone is a pitch class that is a member of, or common to (shared by) two or more scales or sets.

== Common tone theorem ==
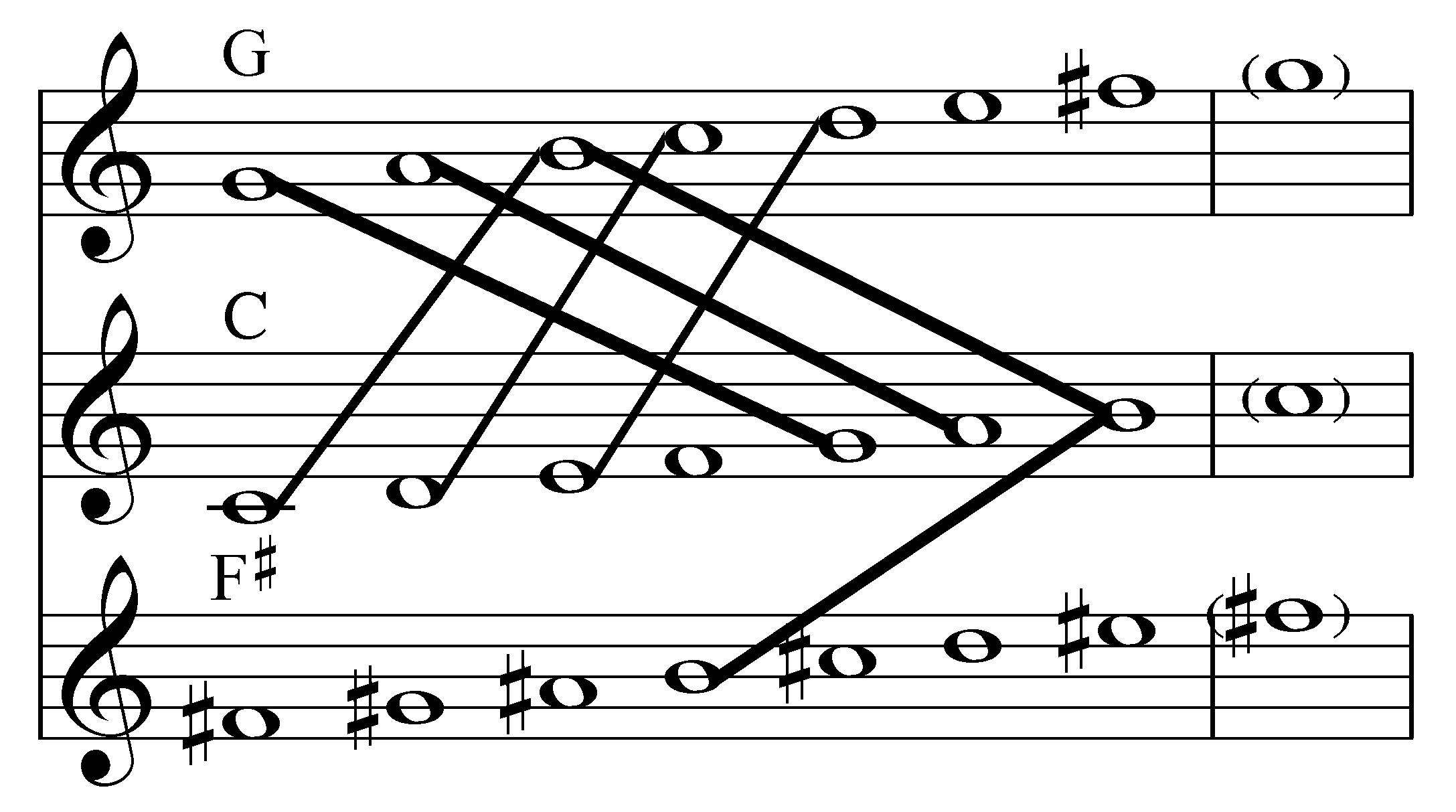
Common tones between G major and C major and between C major and F♯ major, 6 and 1 common tones respectively.

A common tone is a pitch class that is a member of, or common to, a musical scale and a transposition of that scale, as in modulation. Six of seven possible common tones are shared by closely related keys, though keys may also be thought of as more or less closely related according to their number of common tones. "Obviously, tonal distance is in some sense a function of the extent of intersection between diatonic PC collections of tonal systems".

Diatonic transposition	0	1/e	2/t	3/9	4/8	5/7	6/6
Common tones	7	2	5	4	3	6	1

In diatonic set theory the common tone theorem explains that scales possessing the deep scale property share a different number of common tones, not counting enharmonic equivalents (for example, C♯ and C♭ have no common tones with C major), for every different transposition of the scale. However many times an interval class occurs in a diatonic scale is the number of tones common both to the original scale and a scale transposed by that particular interval class. For example, then, modulation to the dominant (transposition by a perfect fifth) includes six common tones between the keys as there are six perfect fifths in a diatonic scale, while transposition by the tritone includes only one common tone as there is only one tritone in a diatonic scale.

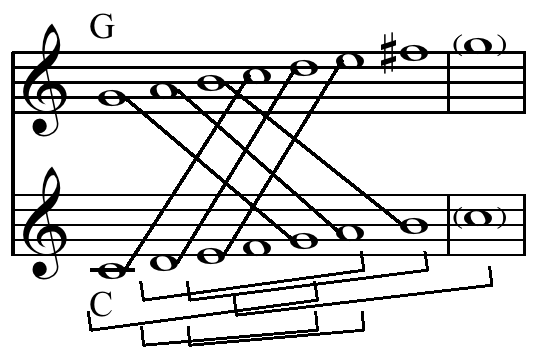
Diatonic scale transposed a perfect fifth: since it contains six perfect fifths the two scales a perfect fifth apart have six common tones.

Key	IC	CT	Notes common with C						
C	0	NA	C	D	E	F	G	A	B
B	1	2			E				B
D♭	1	2	C			F			
D	2	5		D	E		G	A	B
B♭	2	5	C	D		F	G	A	
A	3	4	D	E			A	B	
E♭	3	4	C	D		F	G		
E	4	3			E			A	B
A♭	4	3	C			F	G		
G	5	6	C	D	E		G	A	B
F	5	6	C	D	E	F	G	A	
F♯	6	1							B
G♭	6	1				F			

== Deep scale property ==
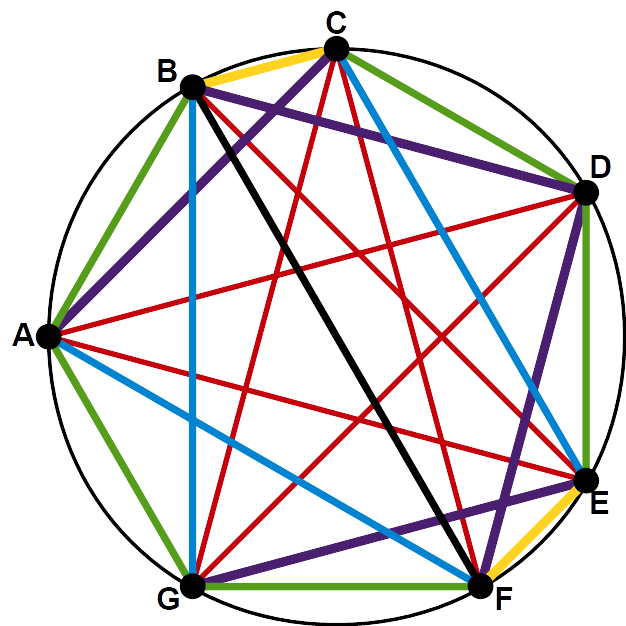
Diatonic scale in the chromatic circle with each interval class a different color, each occurs a unique number of times

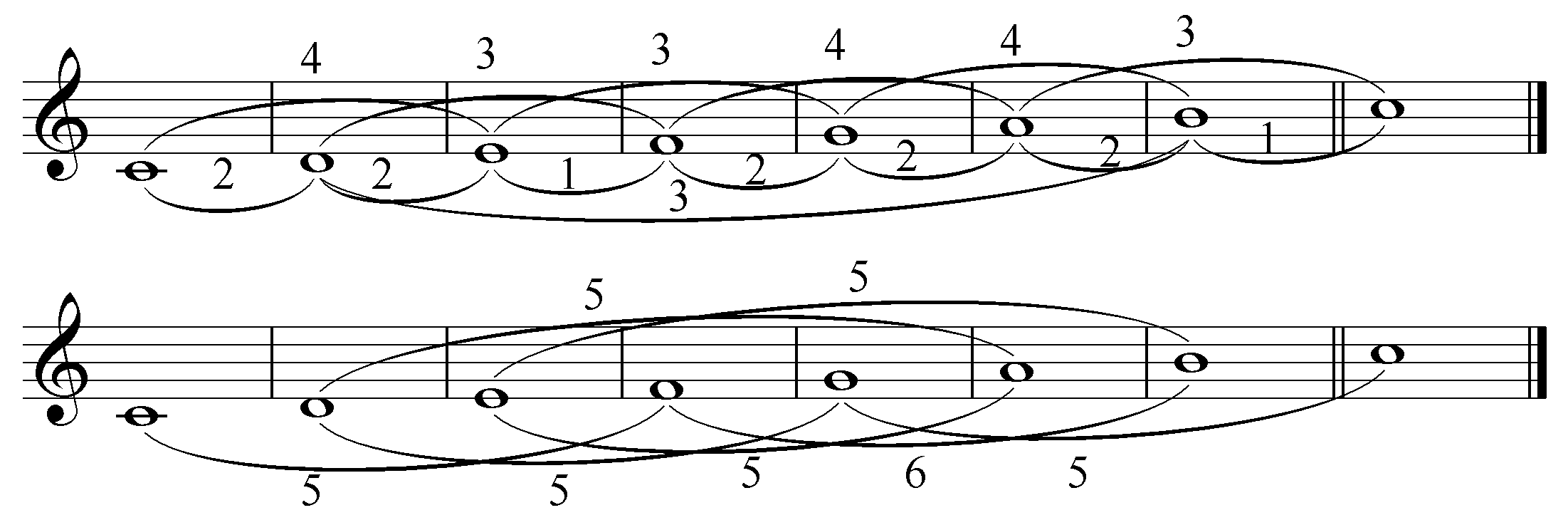
C major scale with interval classes labelled

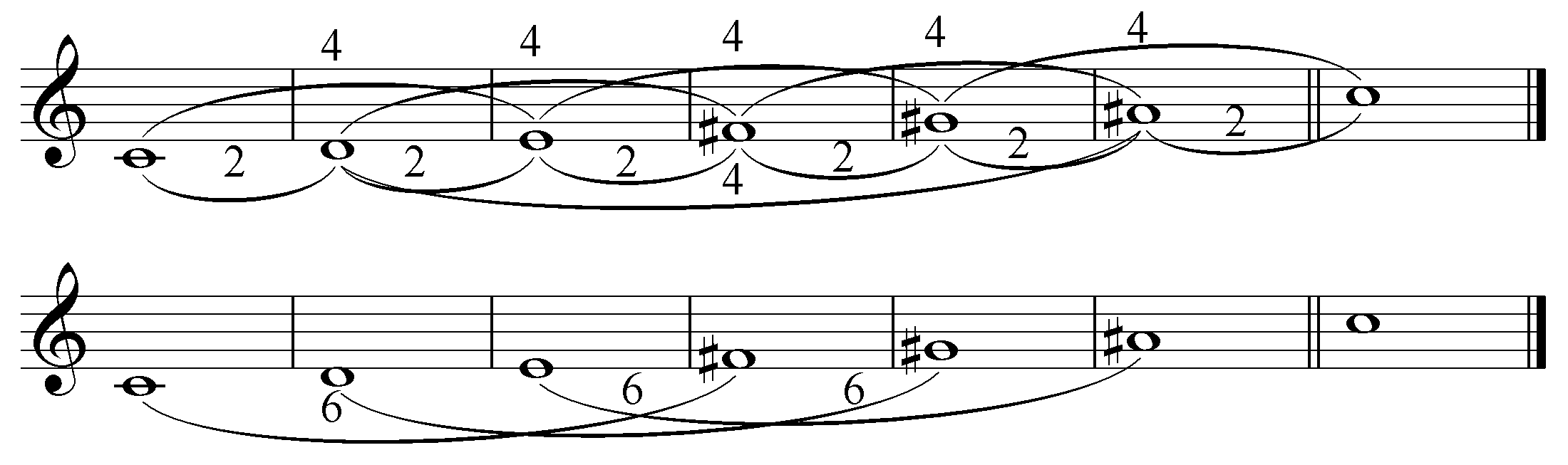
Whole tone scale on C with interval classes labelled

In diatonic set theory, the deep scale property is the quality of pitch class collections or scales containing each interval class a unique number of times. Examples include the diatonic scale (including major, natural minor, and the modes). In twelve-tone equal temperament, all scales with the deep scale property can be generated with any interval coprime with twelve.

For example, the diatonic scale's interval vector contains:

PC	1	2	3	4	5	6
Occurrence	2	5	4	3	6	1

The common tone theorem describes that scales possessing the deep scale property share a different number of common tones for every different transposition of the scale, suggesting an explanation for the use and usefulness of the diatonic collection.

In contrast, the whole tone scale's interval vector contains:

PC	1	2	3	4	5	6
Occurrence	0	6	0	6	0	3

and has only two distinct transpositions (every even transposition of the whole tone scale is identical with the original and every odd transposition has no common tones whatsoever).

== See also ==
- Approach chord
- Common chord (music)
- Rothenberg propriety
- Walkdown
