= Cardinality equals variety =

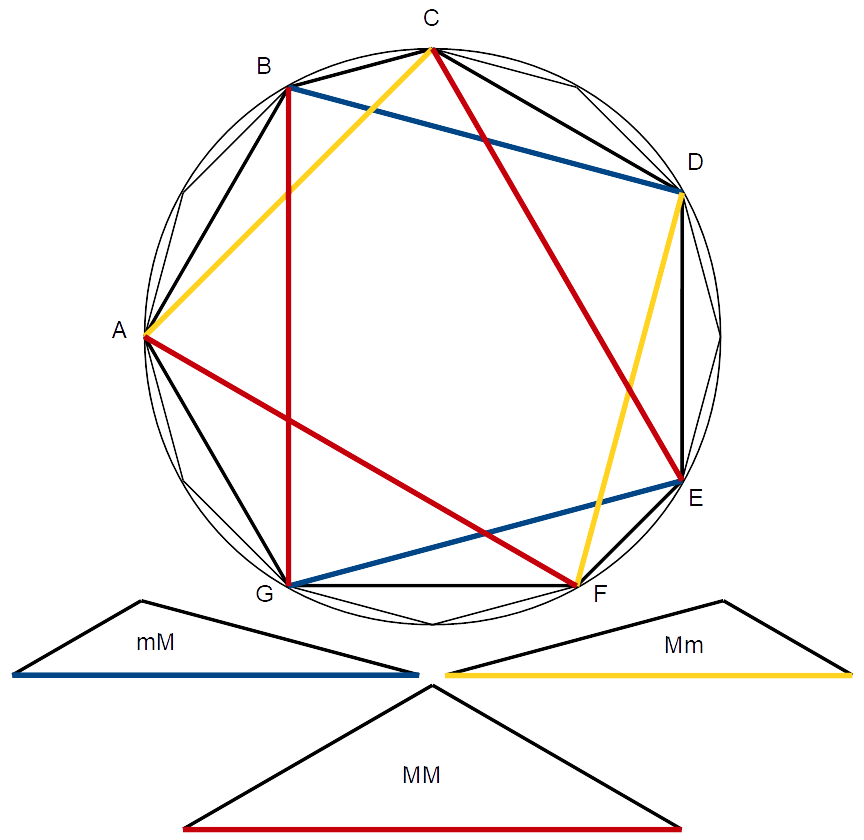
Three note sets from the diatonic scale in the chromatic circle: M2M2=red, M2m2=yellow, and m2M2=blue

The musical operation of scalar transposition shifts every note in a melody by the same number of scale steps. The musical operation of chromatic transposition shifts every note in a melody by the same distance in pitch class space. In general, for a given scale S, the scalar transpositions of a line L can be grouped into categories, or transpositional set classes, whose members are related by chromatic transposition. In diatonic set theory cardinality equals variety when, for any melodic line L in a particular scale S, the number of these classes is equal to the number of distinct pitch classes in the line L.

For example, the melodic line C–D–E has three distinct pitch classes. When transposed diatonically to all scale degrees in the C major scale, we obtain three interval patterns: M2–M2, M2–m2, m2–M2.

Melodic lines in the C major scale with n distinct pitch classes always generate n distinct patterns.

The property was first described by John Clough and Gerald Myerson in "Variety and Multiplicity in Diatonic Systems" (1985) (Johnson 2003, p. 68, 151). Cardinality equals variety in the diatonic collection and the pentatonic scale, and, more generally, what Carey and Clampitt (1989) call "nondegenerate well-formed scales." "Nondegenerate well-formed scales" are those that possess Myhill's property.

== See also ==
- Structure implies multiplicity

== Sources ==
- Johnson, Timothy (2003). Foundations of Diatonic Theory: A Mathematically Based Approach to Music Fundamentals. Key College Publishing. ISBN 1-930190-80-8.
