= Tone scale =

Tone scale may refer to:

- Musical scales, including the Whole tone scale
- Color scales
- Emotional tone scale, a Scientology concept

== See also ==
- Tonic (music)
- Diatonic scale
