= Locrian =

Locrian may refer to:

- Locrians, an ancient Greek ethnic group
  - Locrian Greek, ancient Greek dialect spoken by the Locrians
  - Locris, the territory of the Locrians

In music:

- Locrian mode, a musical mode or diatonic scale
- Major Locrian scale, the scale obtained by sharpening the second and third degrees of the locrian mode
- Locrian ♮2 or Half diminished scale, a musical scale commonly used in jazz and some rock
- Locrian (band), Chicago-based experimental music duo
