= Chord rewrite rules =

Chord progression generation algorithm

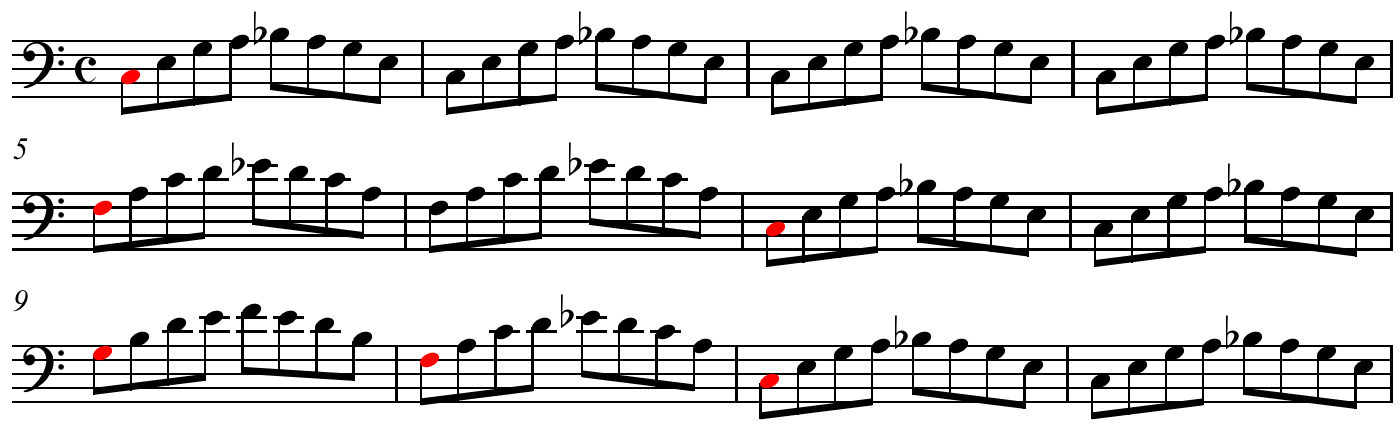
Typical boogie woogie bassline on 12 bar blues progression in C, chord roots in red.

In music, a rewrite rule is a recursive generative grammar, which creates a chord progression from another.

Steedman (1984) has proposed a set of recursive "rewrite rules" which generate all well-formed transformations of jazz, basic I–IV–I–V–I twelve-bar blues chord sequences, and, slightly modified, non-twelve-bar blues I–IV–V sequences ("rhythm changes").

The typical 12-bar blues progression can be notated

1   2   3   4     5   6   7   8    9   10  11  12
I / I / I / I // IV /IV / I / I // V / IV / I / I

where the top line numbers each bar, one slash indicates a bar line, two indicate both a bar line and a phrase ending and a Roman numeral indicates the chord function.

Important transformations include

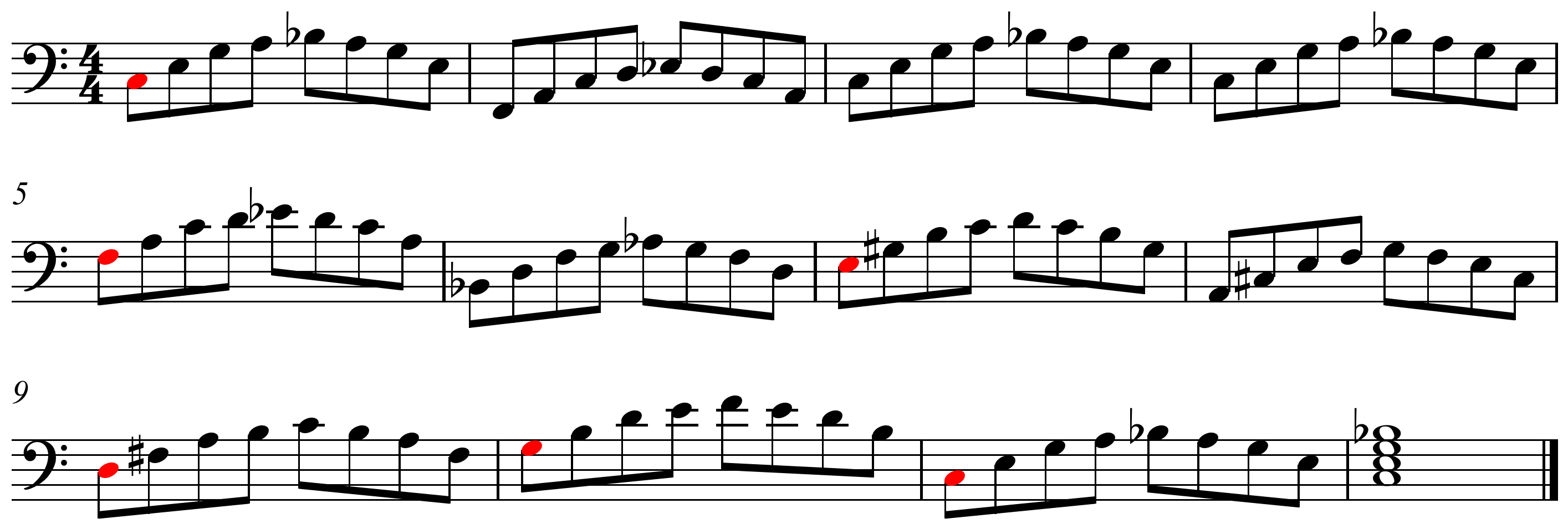
Chord rewrite rules I: replacement or substitution of a chord by its dominant or subdominant.

- replacement or substitution of a chord by its dominant or subdominant:

1    2   3   4      5     6     7     8      9   10   11  12
I / IV / I / I7 // IV / VII7 / III7 / VI7 // II7 / V7 / I / I //

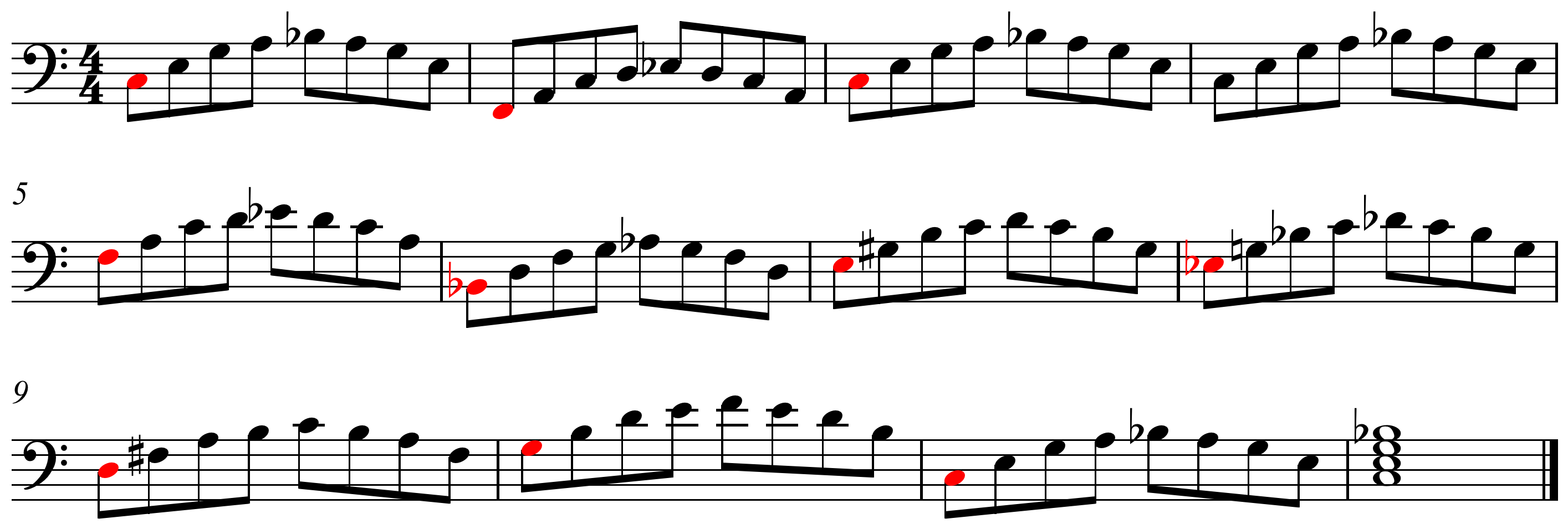
Chord rewrite rules II: use of chromatic passing chords.

- use of chromatic passing chords:

  ...7      8     9 ...
...III7 / ♭III7 / II7...

- and chord alterations such as minor chords, diminished sevenths, etc.

Sequences by fourth, rather than fifth, include Jimi Hendrix's version of "Hey Joe" and Deep Purple's "Hush":

   1            2     3   4        5           6     7   8       9           10    11  12
♭VI, ♭III / ♭VII, IV / I / I // ♭VI, ♭III / ♭VII, IV / I / I // ♭VI, ♭III / ♭VII, IV / I / I //

These often result in Aeolian harmony and lack perfect cadences (V–I). Middleton (1990) suggests that both modal and fourth-oriented structures, rather than being, "distortions or surface transformations of Schenker's favoured V-I kernel, are more likely branches of a deeper principle, that of tonic/not-tonic differentiation."

For the ♭ notation, see Borrowed chord.
