= Arabic scale =

Arabic scale may refer to:

- Double harmonic scale, a scale with two augmented seconds
- Quarter tone scale, or 24 tone equal temperament
- A seventeen tone unequal tuning that was historically used to describe Arabic music
- Major locrian scale, a scale similar to locrian, also the aeolian mode with ♭ 5th and ♯ 3rd, Phrygian dominant scale with ♭ 5th and ♯ 2nd, or Blues Leading-Tone scale with ♭ 6th and ♯ tonic.
