= Comma pump =

Sequence of notes in music theory

In music theory, a comma pump (or comma drift) is a sequence of notes, often a chord progression, where the pitch shifts up or down by a comma (a small interval) every time the sequence is traversed. Comma pumps often arise from a sequence of just intervals that combine to almost, but not exactly, a unison (1:1 ratio).

== Examples ==
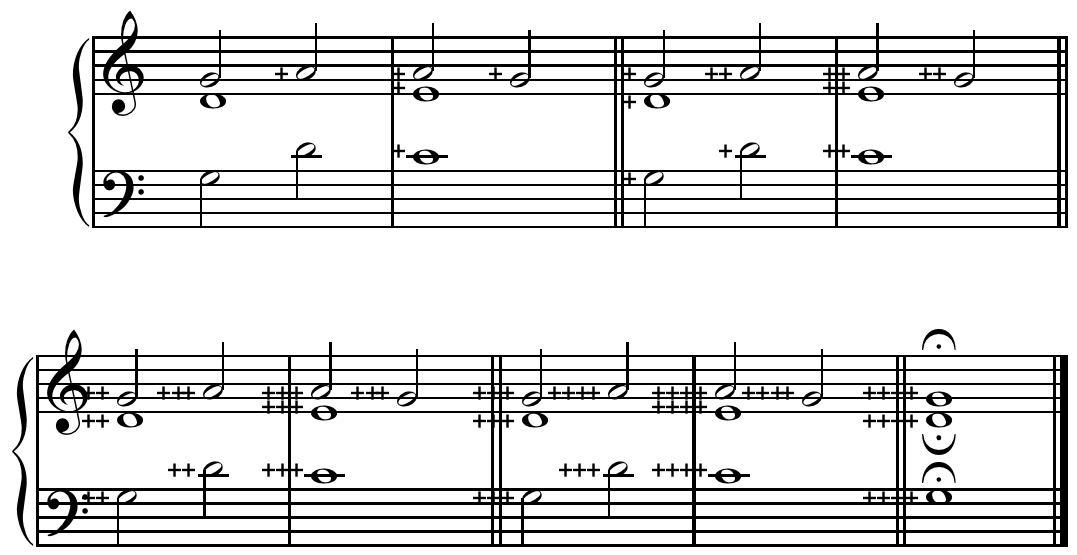
Giovanni Benedetti's 1563 example of a comma "pump" or drift by a comma during a progression. Common tones between chords are the same pitch, with the other notes tuned in pure intervals to the common tones.

The most common comma pump is by the syntonic comma (81:80), arising from the difference between a ditone (two 9:8 intervals, combining to 81:64) and a (just) major third (5:4). Ascending by two tones and then descending by a major third shifts pitch upwards by 81:80, and similarly for other progressions (up a fifth, down a fourth, up a fifth, down a fourth, down a major third: C G D A E C). Study of the comma pump dates back at least to the sixteenth century when the Italian scientist Giovanni Battista Benedetti composed a piece of music to illustrate syntonic comma drift. See Syntonic comma § Comma pump for more.

=== Pythagorean comma ===
A sequence of just fifths on a chromatic circle fail to close due to a comma pump (the size of the gap is the Pythagorean comma), resulting in a "broken" circle of fifths.

Going around the circle of fifths with just fifths results in a pump by the Pythagorean comma.

=== Diesis ===
In 12-tone equal temperament, going up three major thirds or four minor thirds takes one back to the original note in both cases, since adjacent accidentals (such as F♯ and G♭) are enharmonically equivalent. However, in flatter meantone tunings such as 31-tone equal temperament, this results in a pump by one diesis—three major thirds end up slightly lower than the original key, while four minor thirds end up slightly higher than the original key, since adjacent accidentals are not enharmonically equivalent.
