= Structure implies multiplicity =

In diatonic set theory, structure implies multiplicity is a quality of a collection or scale. For collections or scales which have this property, the interval series formed by the shortest distance around a diatonic circle of fifths between members of a series indicates the number of unique interval patterns (adjacently, rather than around the circle of fifths) formed by diatonic transpositions of that series. Structure refers to the intervals in relation to the circle of fifths; multiplicity refers to the number of times each different (adjacent) interval pattern occurs. The property was first described by John Clough and Gerald Myerson in "Variety and Multiplicity in Diatonic Systems" (1985). (Johnson 2003, pp. 68, 151)

Structure implies multiplicity is true of the diatonic collection and the pentatonic scale, and any subset.

For example, cardinality equals variety dictates that a three member diatonic subset of the C major scale, C–D–E transposed to all scale degrees gives three interval patterns: M2–M2, M2–m2, m2–M2.

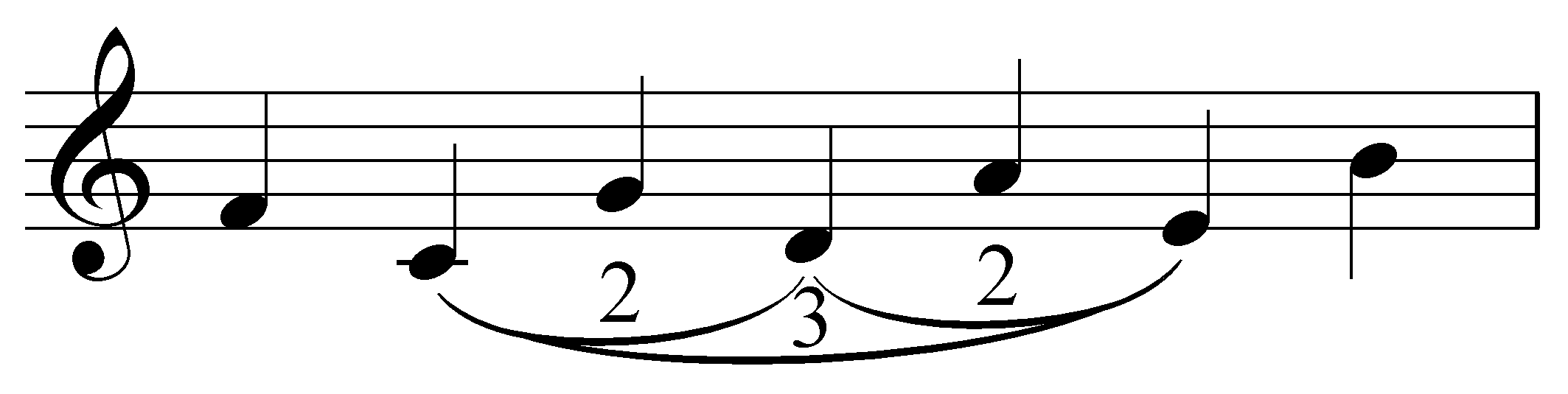
C–D–E on the circle of fifths

On the circle of fifths:

C G D A E B F (C)
  1 2 1 2 1 2  3

E and C are three notes apart, C and D are two notes apart, D and E two notes apart. Just as the distance around the circle of fifths between forms the interval pattern 3–2–2, M2–M2 occurs three times, M2–m2 occurs twice, and m2–M2 occurs twice.

Cardinality equals variety and structure implies multiplicity are true of all collections with Myhill's property.
