= Generated collection =

Red line indicates the major scale on C within the outer circle of fifths

In music theory, a generated collection is a collection or scale formed by repeatedly adding a constant interval in integer notation, the generator, also known as an interval cycle, around the chromatic circle until a complete collection or scale is formed. All scales with the deep scale property can be generated by any interval coprime with the number of notes per octave.

The C major diatonic collection can be generated by adding a cycle of perfect fifths (C7) starting at F: F-C-G-D-A-E-B = C-D-E-F-G-A-B. Using integer notation and 12-tone equal temperament, the standard tuning of Western music: 5 + 7 = 0, 0 + 7 = 7, 7 + 7 = 2, 2 + 7 = 9, 9 + 7 = 4, 4 + 7 = 11.

7-note segment of C5: the C major scale as a generated collection

The C major scale could also be generated using cycle of perfect fourths (C5), as 12 minus any coprime of twelve is also coprime with twelve: 12 − 7 = 5. B-E-A-D-G-C-F.

A generated collection for which a single generic interval corresponds to the single generator or interval cycle used is a MOS (for "moment of symmetry") or well formed generated collection. For example, the diatonic collection is well formed, for the perfect fifth (the generic interval 4) corresponds to the generator 7. Though not all fifths in the diatonic collection are perfect (B-F is a diminished fifth), a well formed generated collection has only one specific interval between scale members (in this case 6)—which corresponds to the generic interval (4, a fifth) but to not the generator (7). The major and minor pentatonic scales are also well formed.

The properties of generated and well-formedness were described by Carey & Clampitt (1989). Earlier, in 1975, theoretician Erv Wilson defined the properties of the idea, and called such a scale a MOS, an acronym for moment of symmetry. Although unpublished until 1999, when it was posted online, this paper was widely distributed and well known throughout the community of microtonal musicians, who adopted the term. The paper also remains more inclusive of further developments of the concept. For instance, the three-gap theorem implies that every generated collection has at most three different steps, the intervals between adjacent tones in the collection,

A degenerate well-formed collection is a scale in which the generator and the interval required to complete the circle or return to the initial note are equivalent and include all scales with equal notes, such as the whole-tone scale.

A bisector is a more general concept used to create collections that cannot be generated but includes all collections which can be generated.

== See also ==
- 833 cents scale
- Cyclic group
- Dissonance and consonance
- Distance model
- Just intonation
- Meantone temperament
- Pythagorean tuning

== Sources ==
- Carey, Norman (July 2007). "Coherence and sameness in well-formed and pairwise well-formed scales". Journal of Mathematics and Music. 1 (2): 79–98. doi:10.1080/17459730701376743. S2CID 120586231.
- Carey, Norman; Clampitt, David (1989). "Aspects of well-formed scales". Music Theory Spectrum. 11: 187–206.
- Clough, John; Engebretsen, Nora; Kochavi, Jonathan (March 1999). "Scales, sets, and interval cycles: A taxonomy". Music Theory Spectrum. 21 (1): 74–104, esp p 79. doi:10.2307/745921. JSTOR 745921.
- Johnson, Timothy A. (2003). Foundations of Diatonic Theory: A mathematically based approach to music fundamentals. Emeryville, CA: Key College Publishing. ISBN 978-1-9301-9080-1. LCCN 2002075736 – via Internet Archive. Scarecrow Press 2008 ed. ISBN 978-0-8108-6213-5.
- Wilson, Erv (26 April 1975). "The basic structure of "moments of symmetry"" (PDF). Letter to John. Poinsettia Drive, L.A., California. Archived from the original (PDF) on 6 October 2022.
