= Generic and specific intervals =

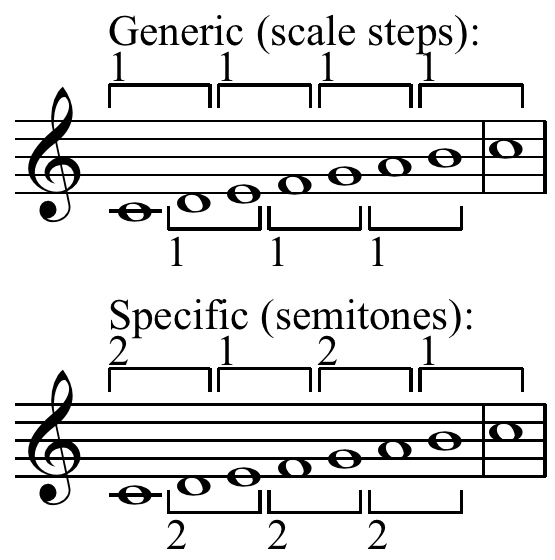
The major scale is maximally even. For example, for every generic interval of a second there are only two possible specific intervals: 1 semitone (a minor second) or 2 semitones (a major second).

In diatonic set theory, a generic interval is the number of scale steps between notes of a collection or scale. The largest generic interval is one less than the number of scale members. (Johnson 2003, p.26)

A specific interval is the clockwise distance between pitch classes on the chromatic circle (interval class), in other words the number of half steps between notes. The largest specific interval is one less than the number of "chromatic" pitches. In twelve tone equal temperament the largest specific interval is 11. (Johnson 2003, p.26)

In the diatonic collection the generic interval is one less than the corresponding diatonic interval:

- Adjacent intervals, seconds, are 1
- Thirds = 2
- Fourths = 3
- Fifths = 4
- Sixths = 5
- Sevenths = 6

The largest generic interval in the diatonic scale being 7 − 1 = 6.

== Myhill's property ==
Myhill's property is the quality of musical scales or collections with exactly two specific intervals for every generic interval, and thus also have the properties of cardinality equals variety, structure implies multiplicity, and being a well-formed generated collection. In other words, each generic interval can be made from one of two possible different specific intervals. For example, there are major or minor and perfect or augmented/diminished variants of all the diatonic intervals:

Diatonic interval	Generic interval	Diatonic intervals	Specific intervals
2nd	1	m2 and M2	1 and 2
3rd	2	m3 and M3	3 and 4
4th	3	P4 and A4	5 and 6
5th	4	d5 and P5	6 and 7
6th	5	m6 and M6	8 and 9
7th	6	m7 and M7	10 and 11

The diatonic and pentatonic collections possess Myhill's property. The concept appears to have been first described by John Clough and Gerald Myerson and named after their associate the mathematician John Myhill. (Johnson 2003, p. 106, 158)

== Sources ==
- Johnson, Timothy (2003). Foundations of Diatonic Theory: A Mathematically Based Approach to Music Fundamentals. Key College Publishing. ISBN 1-930190-80-8.
