= Symmetric scale =

Music scale which equally divides the octave

In music theory, a music scale can have certain symmetries, namely translational symmetry and inversional or mirror symmetry.

The most prominent examples are scales which equally divides the octave. The concept and term appears to have been introduced by Joseph Schillinger and further developed by Nicolas Slonimsky as part of his famous Thesaurus of Scales and Melodic Patterns. In twelve-tone equal temperament, the octave can only be equally divided into two, three, four, six, or twelve parts, which consequently may be filled in by adding the same exact interval or sequence of intervals to each resulting note (called "interpolation of notes").

This leads to scales with translational symmetry which include the octatonic scale (also known as the symmetric diminished scale; its mirror image is known as the inverse symmetric diminished scale) and the two-semitone tritone scale:

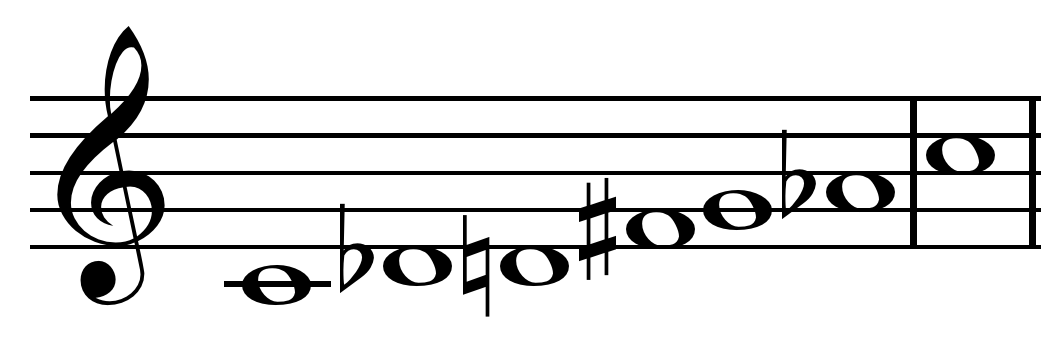
Two-semitone tritone scale on C divides the octave into two equal parts (C-F♯ & F# to (octave above) C) and fills in the resulting tritone gaps with two semitones (Db-D, G-Ab).

As explained above, both are composed of repeating sub-units within an octave. This property allows these scales to be transposed to other notes, yet retain exactly the same notes as the original scale (Translational symmetry).

This may be seen quite readily with the whole tone scale on C:

- {C, D, E, F♯, G♯, A♯, C}

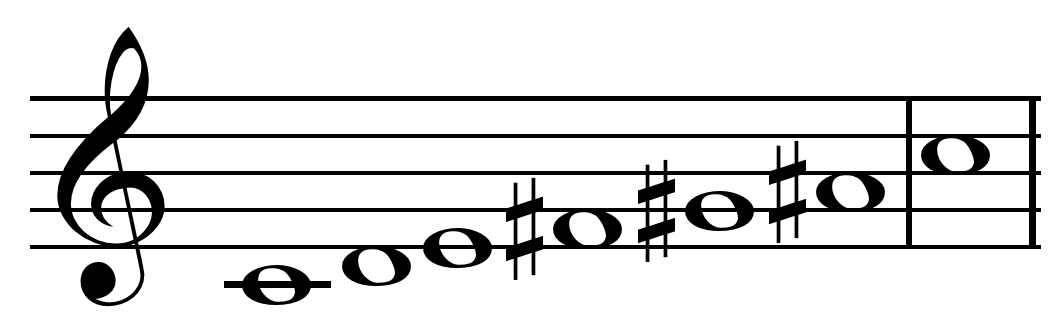
Synthesized sample

If transposed up a whole tone to D, contains exactly the same notes in a different permutation:

- {D, E, F♯, G♯, A♯, C, D}

In the case of inversionally symmetrical scales, the inversion of the scale is identical. Thus the intervals between scale degrees are symmetrical if read from the "top" (end) or "bottom" (beginning) of the scale (mirror symmetry). Examples include the Neapolitan Major scale (fourth mode of the Major Locrian scale), the Javanese slendro, the chromatic scale, whole-tone scale, Dorian scale, the Aeolian Dominant scale (fifth mode of the melodic minor), and the double harmonic scale.

Pitch constellations of five symmetric scales.

Asymmetric scales are "far more common" than symmetric scales and this may be accounted for by the inability of translational symmetric scales to possess the property of uniqueness (containing each interval class a unique number of times) which assists with determining the location of notes in relation to the first note of the scale.

== See also ==
- Modes of limited transposition
- Symmetry#In music
