= Pitch constellation =

Pitch constellations showing all twelve chromatic pitches

A pitch constellation is a graphical representation of pitches used to describe musical scales, modes, chords or other groupings of pitches within an octave range. It consists of a circle with markings along the circumference or lines from the center which indicate pitches. Most pitch constellations use of a subset of pitches chosen from the twelve pitch chromatic scale. In this case the points on the circle are spaced like the twelve hour markings on an analog clock where each tick mark represents a semitone.

== Scales and modes ==
The pitch constellation provides an easy way to identify certain patterns and similarities between harmonic structures.

For example.

- A major scale consists of a circle with markings at 0 (or 12), 2, 4, 5, 7, 9 and 11 o'clock.
- A minor scale consists of a circle with markings at 0 (or 12), 2, 3, 5, 7, 8 and 10 o'clock.

The diagrams above show the two scales marked with "scale degrees". It can be observed that the tonic, second, fourth and fifth are shared, while the minor scale flattens the third, sixth and seventh notes relative to the major scale. Another observation is that the minor scale's constellation is the same as the major scale, but rotated +90 degrees.

In the following drawing all of the major/minor scales are drawn. Note that the constellation for all the major scales or all the minor scales are identical. The different scales are generated by rotating the note overlay. The notes that need to be sharpened/flattened can be easily identified.

Major and minor scales

Moreover, if we draw all seven diatonic modes we can see them all as rotations of the Ionian mode. Note also the significance of the 6 o'clock point. This corresponds to a tritone. The modes including pitches a tritone from the tonic (Locrian and Lydian) are least used. The 5 o'clock and 7 o'clock pitches are also important points corresponding to a perfect fourth and perfect fifth respectively. The most used scales/modes - major (Ionian mode), minor (Aeolian mode) and Mixolydian - include these pitches.

Symmetric scales have simple representations in this scheme.

More exotic scales - such as the pentatonic, blues and octatonic - can also be drawn and related to the common scales.

A more complete list of musical scales and modes

== Other overlays ==
In previous sections we saw how various overlays (scale degrees, semi-tone numbering, notes) can be used to notate the circumference of the constellation. Various other overlays can be laid around the constellation. For example:

- Intervals.
- Solfège.
- Pitch ratios (ratios of pitch frequencies).

Note that once a pitch constellation has been determined, any number of overlays (notes, solfège, intervals, etc.) may be placed on top for analysis/comparison. Often generating one harmonic relationship from another is simply a matter of rotating the overlay or constellation or shifting one or two pitch locations.

== Chords ==
Similarities between chords can also be observed as well as the significance of augmented/diminished notes.

For triads we have the following:

And for seventh chords:

== Circle of fifths ==
Beginning with a pitch constellation of a chromatic scale, the notes of a circle of fifths can be easily generated. Starting at C and moving across the circle to the opposite side and then one tick clockwise, a line is drawn with an arrow indicating the direction moved. Continuing from that point (to the opposite side of the circle and one tick clockwise) all points are connected. Moving through this pattern the notes of the circle of fifths can be determined (C, G, D, A ...).

== Technical note ==
The ratio of the frequencies between two pitches in the constellation can be determined as follows. Take the length of the arc (measured clockwise) between the two points and divide by the circumference of the circle. The frequency ratio is two raised to this power. For example, for a fifth (P5, which is located at 7 o'clock relative to the tonic T) the frequency ratio is:

${\text{f}_\text{P5} \over \text{f}_\text{T}} = 2 ^ {( 7 / 12 )} \approx 1.49821 \approx {3 \over 2}$
