= Norman Carey =

- Born: 8 February 1934; Newport, Wales
- Died: 5 November 2017 (aged 83)
- Education: St Catharine's College, Cambridge
- Scientific career
- Workplaces: George Washington University; St Thomas' Hospital; G.D. Searle; Celltech
- Doctoral students: Michael Houghton

Norman Henry Carey (8 February 1934 – 5 November 2017) was a British scientist who helped to establish Celltech in 1980, where he was the founding director of research and development until 1992.

Born in Newport, Wales, he attended St Julian's secondary school in Newport, before winning a scholarship at the age of 17 to read natural sciences at St Catharine's College, Cambridge. He graduated from Cambridge with a BA in 1954 and with a PhD in biochemistry in 1958.

He worked at George Washington University, St Thomas' Hospital, and G.D. Searle, prior to joining Celltech in 1980. While at Searle in the 1970s he was a doctoral supervisor to Michael Houghton, who was awarded the Nobel Prize in Physiology or Medicine in 2020.
