= Neapolitan scale =

Musical Scale

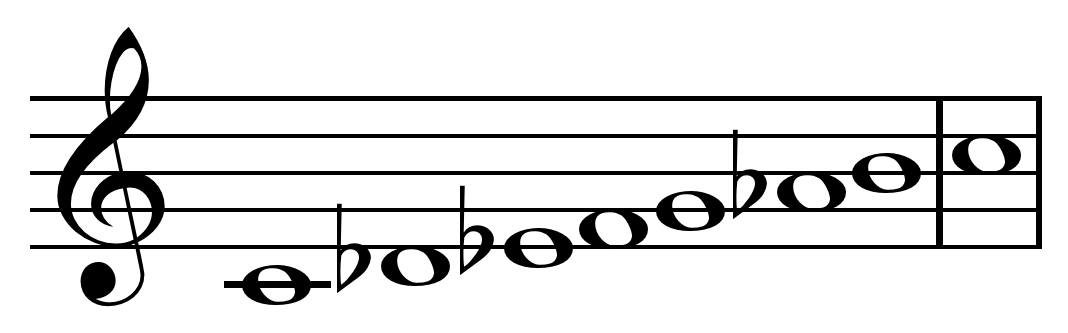
Neapolitan minor scale on C.

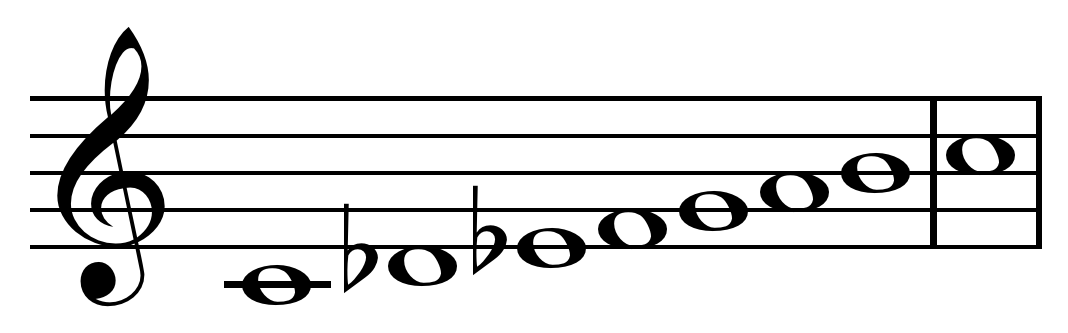
Neapolitan major scale on C.

In music, the major Neapolitan scale and the minor Neapolitan scale are two musical scales. Both scales are minor, in that they both contain a minor third above the root. The major and minor Neapolitan scales are instead differentiated by the quality of their sixth.

The sequence of scale steps for the Neapolitan minor is as follows:

1		♭2		♭3		4		5		♭6		7		8
A		B^{♭}		C		D		E		F		G^{♯}		A
	H		W		W		W		H		W+H		H
C		D^{♭}		E^{♭}		F		G		A^{♭}		B		C

And for the Neapolitan major:

1		♭2		♭3		4		5		6		7		8
A		B^{♭}		C		D		E		F^{♯}		G^{♯}		A
	H		W		W		W		W		W		H
C		D^{♭}		E^{♭}		F		G		A		B		C

The scales are distinguished from the harmonic and ascending melodic minor scales by the lowered supertonic or second scale degree. This could also be known as the "Phrygian harmonic minor" or "Phrygian melodic minor." The scale therefore shares with the Phrygian mode the property of having a minor second above the tonic.

Both are accompanied well by power or minor chords.

The 4th mode of the Neapolitan major, also known as the Lydian Dominant ♭6 scale, is an excellent choice for the 9 ♯11 ♭13 chord. Said mode contains all the alterations plus the ♮5. A whole tone scale is often used but that mode lacks the ♮5 that the Lydian Dominant ♭6 contains.

The 5th mode of the Neapolitan major is also known as the major Locrian scale.

== Modes ==
The scale contains the following modes:

Mode	Name of scale	Degrees								Notes (on C Neap. Minor)								Triad Chords	Seventh Chords
1	Neapolitan Minor	1	♭2	♭3	4	5	♭6	7	8	C	D♭	E♭	F	G	A♭	B	C	Cm	Cm^{maj7}
2	Lydian ♯6	1	2	3	♯4	5	♯6	7	8	D♭	E♭	F	G	A♭	B	C	D♭	D♭	D♭^{maj7} or D♭^{♯6} (equivalent to D♭^{7})
3	Mixolydian Augmented	1	2	3	4	♯5	6	♭7	8	E♭	F	G	A♭	B	C	D♭	E♭	E♭+	E♭+^{7}
4	Romani Minor, Aeolian/Natural Minor ♯4, or Hungarian/Gypsy Minor ♭7	1	2	♭3	♯4	5	♭6	♭7	8	F	G	A♭	B	C	D♭	E♭	F	Fm	Fm^{7}
5	Locrian Dominant (or Locrian ♮3)	1	♭2	3	4	♭5	♭6	♭7	8	G	A♭	B	C	D♭	E♭	F	G	G^{♭5}	G^{7♭5}
6	Ionian/Major ♯2	1	♯2	3	4	5	6	7	8	A♭	B	C	D♭	E♭	F	G	A♭	A♭ or A♭m	A♭^{maj7} or A♭m^{maj7}
7	Ultralocrian/Altered Diminished 3	1	♭2	3	♭4	♭5	♭6	7	8	B	C	D♭	E♭	F	G	A♭	B	*Bsus2^{♭5}	**B6sus2^{♭5}

Mode	Name of scale	Degrees								Notes (on C Neap. Major)								Triad Chords	Seventh Chords
1	Neapolitan Major	1	♭2	♭3	4	5	6	7	8	C	D♭	E♭	F	G	A	B	C	Cm	Cm^{maj7}
2	Leading Whole Tone (or Lydian Augmented ♯6)	1	2	3	♯4	♯5	♯6	7	8	D♭	E♭	F	G	A	B	C	D♭	D♭+	D♭+^{maj7} or D♭+^{♯6} (equivalent to D♭+^{7})
3	Lydian Augmented Dominant	1	2	3	♯4	♯5	6	♭7	8	E♭	F	G	A	B	C	D♭	E♭	E♭+	E♭+^{7}
4	Lydian Dominant ♭6 (or Melodic Major ♯4)	1	2	3	♯4	5	♭6	♭7	8	F	G	A	B	C	D♭	E♭	F	F	F^{7}
5	Major Locrian (Locrian ♮2 ♮3, Aeolian Dominant ♭5, Arabian)	1	2	3	4	♭5	♭6	♭7	8	G	A	B	C	D♭	E♭	F	G	G^{♭5}	G^{7♭5}
6	Half-Diminished ♭4 (or Altered Dominant ♯2)	1	2	♭3	♭4	♭5	♭6	♭7	8	A	B	C	D♭	E♭	F	G	A	A^{ο} or *A^{♭5}	A^{ø7} or ***A^{7♭5}
7	Altered Dominant 3	1	♭2	3	♭4	♭5	♭6	♭7	8	B	C	D♭	E♭	F	G	A	B	*Bsus2^{♭5}	***B7sus2^{♭5}

Notes :
- * While this triad consisted of 1, ♭4 (~3), and ♭5 notes, this is not really a normal triad since no use of 3rd-grade notes (in B : D or D♯/E♭). Instead, this triad more likely shaped as sus♭4 triad (although ♭4 is enharmonic to 3).
- ** 7 enharmonic to 6, so the 6th chords is available instead of 7th (thus being used here).
- *** These chords can actually be respelled as 7alt (the 7♭5 is one of the altered dominant chords).

== See also ==
- Neapolitan chord
- Neapolitan school
