= Circle of fifths text table =

Table illustrating the circle of fifths

The circle of fifths text table shows the number of flats or sharps in each of the diatonic musical scales and keys. Both C major and A minor keys have no flats or sharps.

| No. | Flats | | Sharps | |
| No. | Major | minor | Major | minor |
|---|---|---|---|---|
| 0 | C | a | C | a |
| 1 | F | d | G | e |
| 2 | B♭ | g | D | b |
| 3 | E♭ | c | A | f♯ |
| 4 | A♭ | f | E | c♯ |
| 5 | D♭ | b♭ | B | g♯ |
| 6 | G♭ | e♭ | F♯ | d♯ |
| 7 | C♭ | a♭ | C♯ | a♯ |
| 8 | F♭ | d♭ | G♯ | e♯ |

In the table, minor keys are written with lowercase letters, for brevity. However, in common guitar tabs notation, a minor key is designated with a lowercase "m". For example, A-minor is "Am" and D♯ minor is "D♯m").

The small interval between equivalent notes, such as F♯ and G♭, is the Pythagorean comma. Minor scales start with, major scales start with.

== See also ==
- Circle of fifths
- Key signature
- Musical notation
