= Chromatic circle =

Clock diagram for displaying relationships among pitch classes

Twelve-tone equal temperament's chromatic circle

The chromatic circle is a clock diagram for displaying relationships among the equal-tempered pitch classes making up a given equal temperament tuning's chromatic scale on a circle.

== Explanation ==
If one starts on any equal-tempered pitch and repeatedly ascends by the musical interval of a semitone, one will eventually land on a pitch with the same pitch class as the initial one, having passed through all the other equal-tempered chromatic pitch classes in between. Since the space is circular, it is also possible to descend by semitone.

The chromatic circle is useful because it represents melodic distance, which is often correlated with physical distance on musical instruments. For instance, assuming 12-tone equal temperament, to move from any C on a keyboard to the nearest E, one must move up four semitones, corresponding to four clockwise steps on the chromatic circle. One can also move down by eight semitones, corresponding to eight counterclockwise steps on the pitch class circle.

Larger motions (or in pitch space) can be represented in pitch class space by paths that "wrap around" the chromatic circle one or more times.

The circle of fifths in 12-tone equal temperament drawn within the chromatic circle as a star dodecagon

For any positive integer N, one can represent all of the equal-tempered pitch classes of N-tone equal temperament by the cyclic group of order N, or equivalently, the residue classes modulo twelve, Z/NZ. For example, in twelve-tone equal temperament, the group $Z_{12}$ has four generators, which can be identified with the ascending and descending semitones and the ascending and descending perfect fifths. In other tunings, such as 31 equal temperament, many more generators are possible.

The semitonal generator gives rise to the chromatic circle, while the perfect fourth and perfect fifth give rise to the circle of fifths.

== Comparison with circle of fifths ==
A key difference between the chromatic circle and the circle of fifths is that the former is truly a continuous space: every point on the circle corresponds to a conceivable pitch class, and every conceivable pitch class corresponds to a point on the circle. By contrast, the circle of fifths is fundamentally a discrete structure, and there is no obvious way to assign pitch classes to each of its points.
