= Vasili Byros =

Greek-American music theorist, musicologist and pianist

Vasili Byros (born 1976) is a Greek-American music theorist, musicologist and pianist. He is best known for his contributions to the field of music schemata theory and partimento.

== Education ==
Byros is an alumnus of the Aaron Copland School of Music, receiving his B.A. in music composition in 2001 and M.A. in music history and music theory in 2003. Byros received his PhD in Music Theory from Yale Graduate School of Arts and Sciences' Department of Music in 2009. He is currently a tenured associate professor of Music Theory and Cognition at Northwestern University since 2010, after spending a year at the Jacobs School of Music of Indiana University as a Post-Doctoral Resident Scholar. In 2017, Byros received the Charles Deering McCormick Professor of Teaching Excellence.

== Research related to Music Schemata Theory ==
=== Le Sol Fi Sol ===
One of Byros' notable contributions to Music Schemata Theory is his study of the Le-Sol-Fi-Sol Schema in Ludwig van Beethoven's Eroica Symphony.

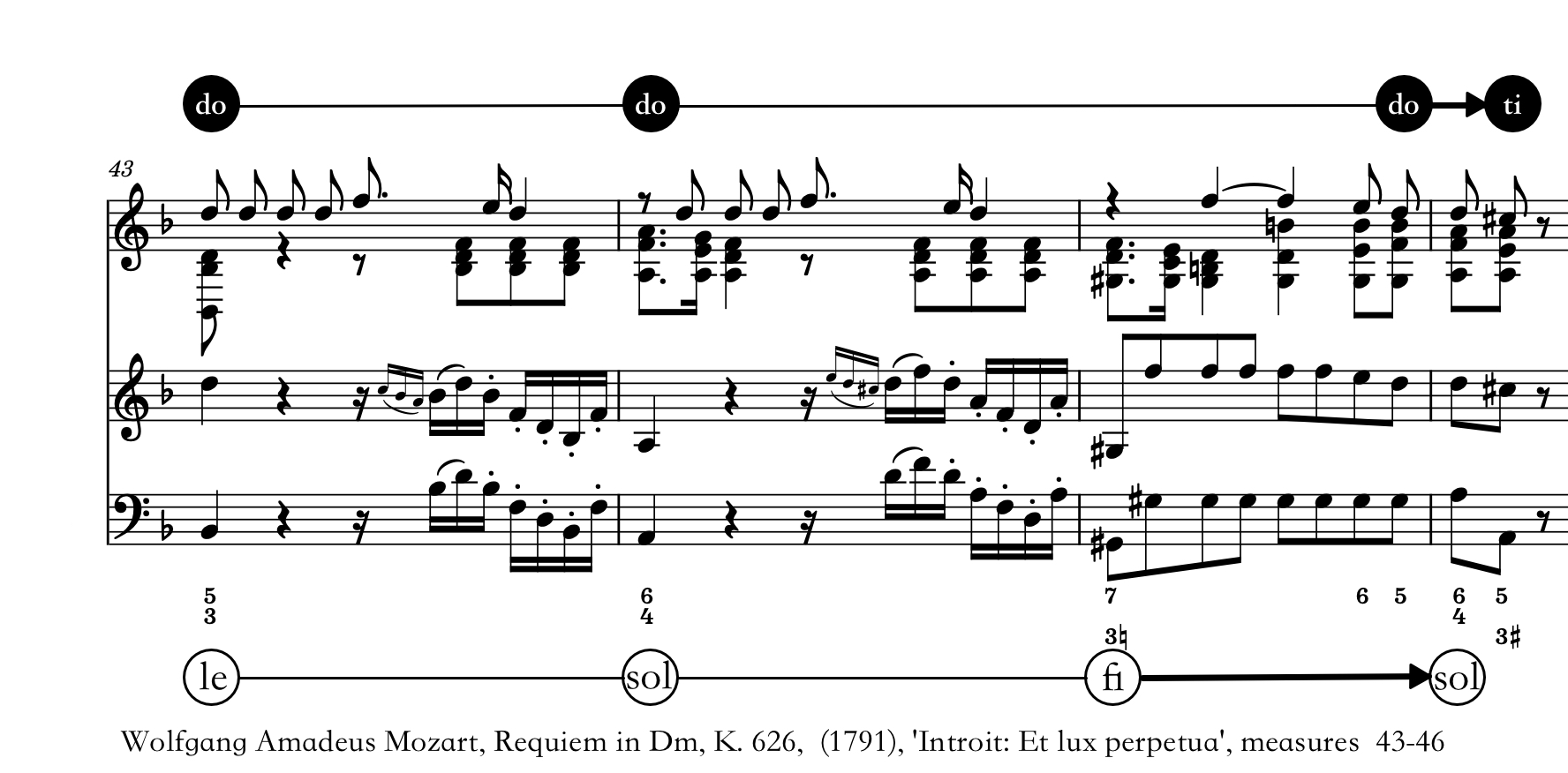
An example of the Le-Sol-Fi-Sol Schema in Mozart's Requiem

The le-sol-fi-sol is a 4-stage pattern, based on a b6-5-#4–5 bass line. Its most common harmonization is VI–i6/4–#ivo7–V(7), frequently with a cadential 6/4 over the dominant. The function of the pattern's first three stages is equivalent to that of an augmented sixth chord.

=== Fonte-Romanesca ===
Byros is also noted for identifying and naming a common music schema popularized by Arcangelo Corelli and still used a century later by Wolfgang Amadeus Mozart known as the Fonte-Romanesca, which shares the characteristics of a Fonte and a Romanesca.

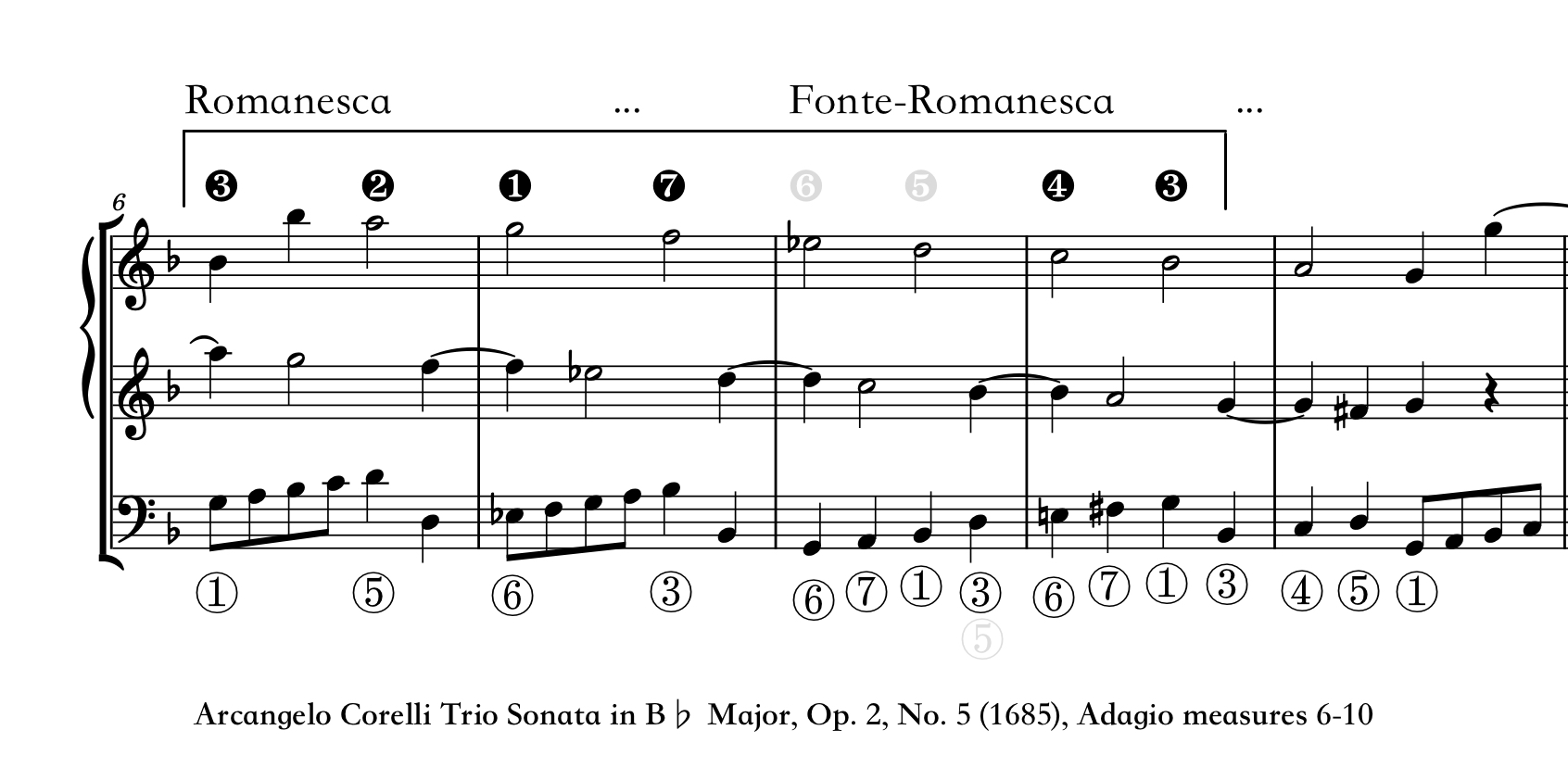
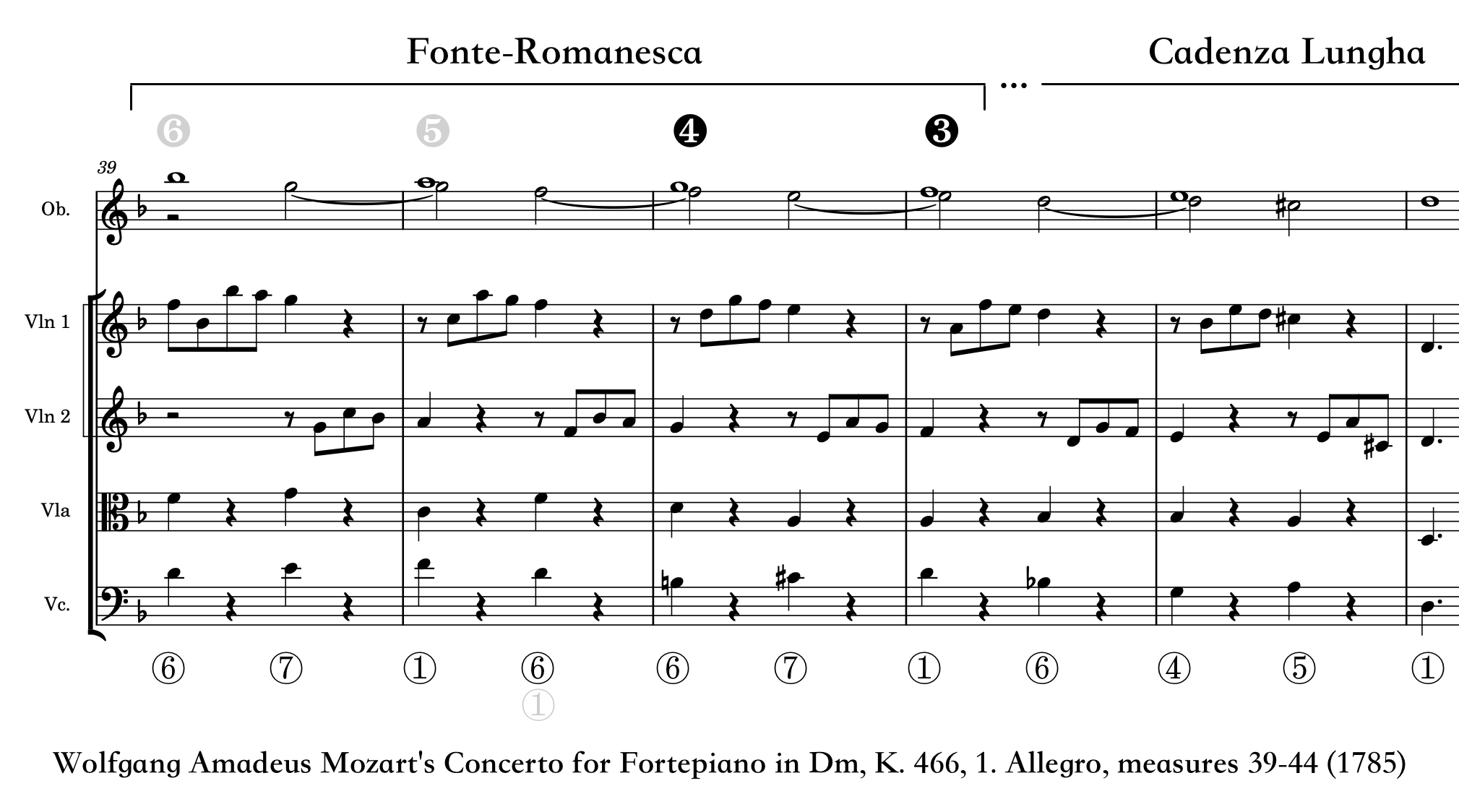
A comparison between Corelli and Mozart's use of the Fonte-Romanesca

The Fonte-Romanesca is a chromatic and modulating variant of the so-called Pachelbel sequence. Its main element is a bass 6-7-1 (la-ti-do) progression, which is equivalent to the last three stages of the ascending Rule of Octave. This 6-7-1 progression is successively transposed down a third, each time to a new key, for example Bb major to G minor. Extended versions contain as many as three transpositions: e.g., Bb major–G minor–Eb major–C minor.

== Awards ==
- Outstanding Publication Award (2017) – Prelude on a Partimento: Invention in the Compositional Pedagogy of the German States in the Time of J. S. Bach – Society for Music Theory.

== See also ==
- Partimento
- John A. Rice (musicologist)
- Robert Gjerdingen
