= Figured bass =

Musical notation

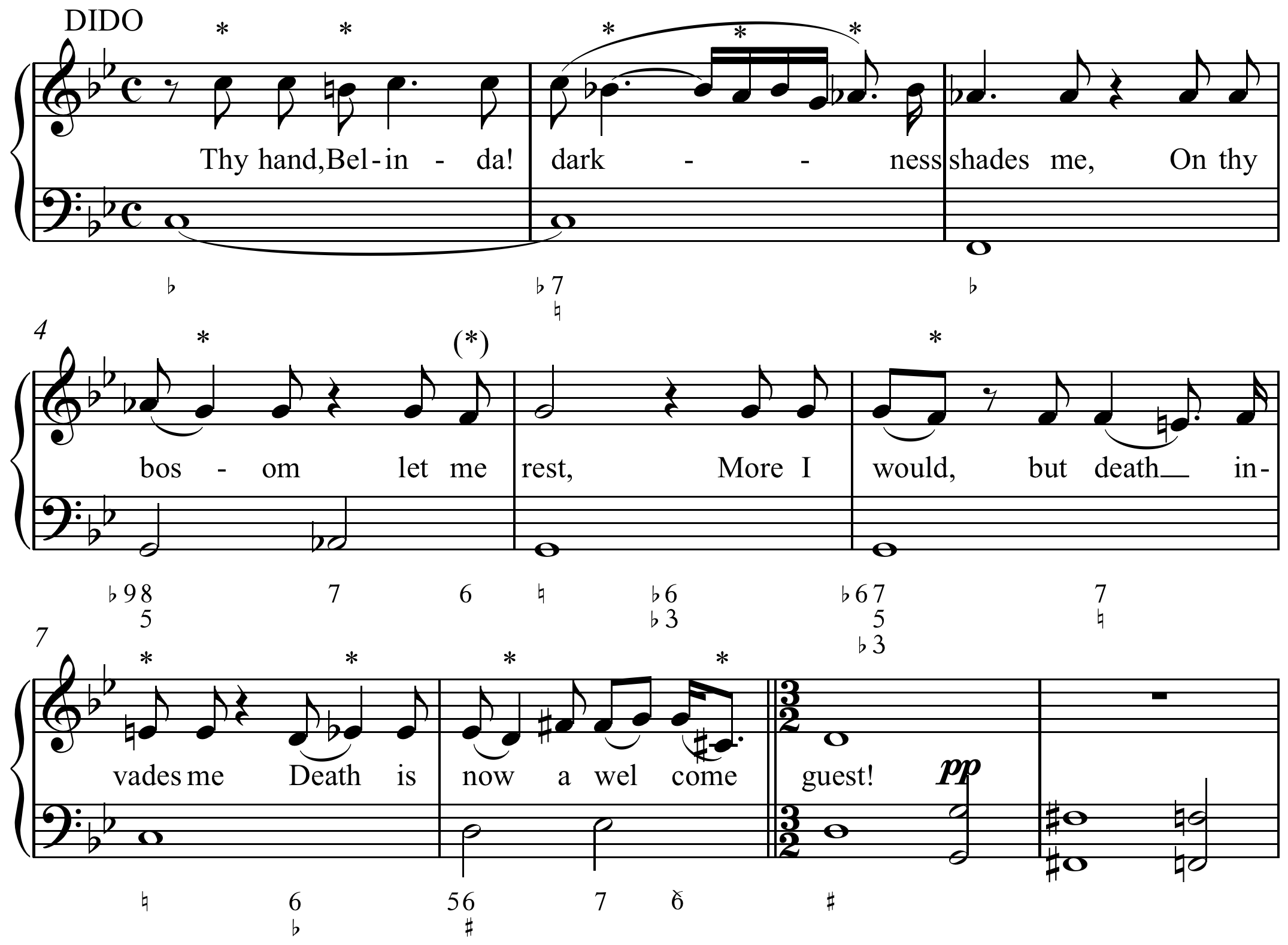
Melody from the opening of Henry Purcell's "Thy Hand, Belinda", Dido and Aeneas (1689) with figured bass below ( with figured bass realization).

Figured bass is musical notation in which numerals and symbols appear above or below (or next to) a bass note. The numerals and symbols (often accidentals) indicate intervals, chords, and non-chord tones that a musician playing piano, harpsichord, organ, or lute (or other instruments capable of playing chords) should play in relation to the bass note. Figured bass is closely associated with basso continuo: a historically improvised accompaniment used in almost all genres of music in the Baroque period of Classical music (c. 1600–1750), though rarely in modern music. Figured bass is also known as thoroughbass.

Other systems for denoting or representing chords include plain staff notation, used in classical music; Roman numerals, commonly used in harmonic analysis; chord letters, sometimes used in modern musicology; the Nashville Number System; and various chord names and symbols used in jazz and popular music (e.g., C Major or simply C; D minor, Dm, or D−; G^{7}, etc.).

== Basso continuo ==
Basso continuo parts, most common in the Baroque era (1600–1750), provided the harmonic structure of the music by supplying a bassline and a chord progression. The phrase is often shortened to continuo, and the instrumentalists playing the continuo part are called the continuo group.

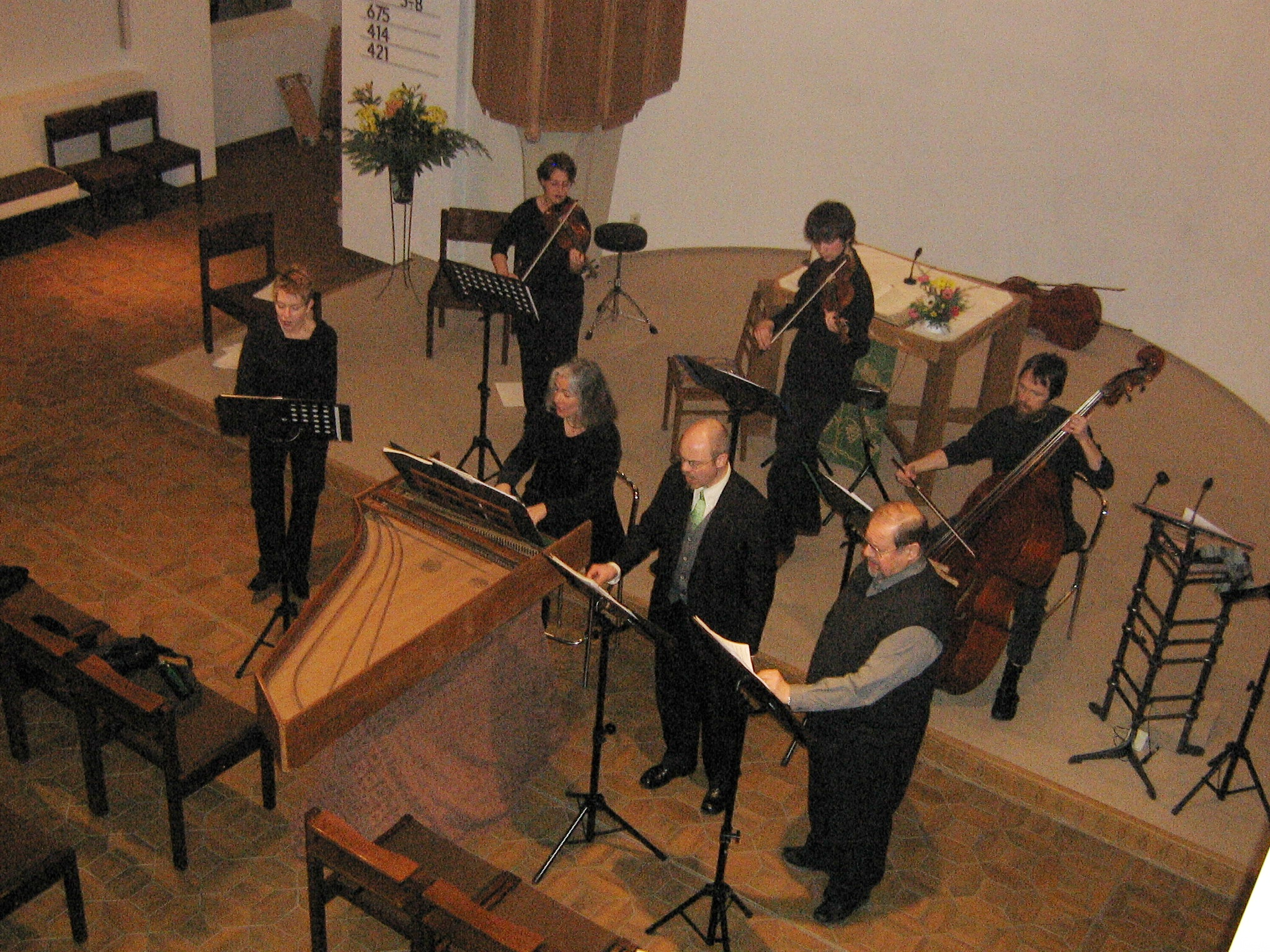
A harpsichordist and a bassist play continuo for a small group of singers.

The makeup of the continuo group is often left to the discretion of the performers (or, for a larger performance, the conductor), and practice varied enormously within the Baroque period. At least one instrument capable of playing chords must be included, such as a piano, harpsichord, organ, lute, theorbo, guitar, regal, or harp. In addition, any number of instruments that play in the bass register may be included, such as cello, double bass, bass viol, or bassoon. The most common combination, at least in modern performances, is harpsichord and cello for instrumental works and secular vocal works, such as operas, and organ and cello for sacred music. A double bass may be added, particularly when accompanying a lower-pitched solo voice (e.g., a bass singer).

Typically performers match the instrument families used in the full ensemble: including bassoon when the work includes oboes or other winds, but restricting it to cello and/or double bass if only strings are involved. Harps, lutes, and other handheld instruments are more typical of early 17th-century music. Sometimes instruments are specified by the composer: in L'Orfeo (1607) Monteverdi calls for an exceptionally varied instrumentation, with multiple harpsichords and lutes with a bass violin in the pastoral scenes followed by lamenting to the accompaniment of organo di legno and chitarrone, while Charon stands watch to the sound of a regal.

The keyboard (or other chord-playing instrument) player realizes (adds in an improvised fashion) a continuo part by playing, in addition to the notated bass line, notes above it to complete chords, either determined ahead of time or improvised in performance. The figured bass notation, described below, is a guide, but performers are also expected to use their musical judgment and the other instruments or voices (notably the lead melody and any accidentals that might be present in it) as a guide. Experienced players sometimes incorporate motives found in the other instrumental parts into their improvised chordal accompaniment. Modern editions of such music usually supply a realized keyboard part, fully written out in staff notation for a player, in place of improvisation. With the rise in historically informed performance, however, the number of performers who are able to improvise their parts from the figures, as Baroque players would have done, has increased.

Basso continuo, though an essential structural and identifying element of the Baroque period, rapidly declined in the classical period (up to around 1800). A late example is C. P. E. Bach's Concerto in D minor for flute, strings and basso continuo (1747). Examples of its use in the 19th century are rarer, but they do exist: masses by Anton Bruckner, Beethoven, and Franz Schubert, for example, have a basso continuo part that was for an organist.

== Figured bass notation ==
A part notated with figured bass consists of a bass line notated with notes on a musical staff plus added numbers and accidentals (or in some cases (back)slashes added to a number) beneath the staff to indicate what intervals above the bass notes should be played, and therefore which inversions of which chords are to be played.

The phrase tasto solo indicates that only the bass line (without any upper chords) is to be played for a short period, usually until the next figure is encountered. This instructs the chord-playing instrumentalist not to play any improvised chords for a period. The reason tasto solo had to be specified was because it was an accepted convention that if no figures were present in a section of otherwise figured bass line, the chord-playing performer would either assume that it was a root-position triad, or deduce from the harmonic motion that another figure was implied. For example, if a continuo part in the key of C begins with a C bass note in the first measure, which descends to a B♮ in the second measure, even if there were no figures, the chord-playing instrumentalist would deduce that this was most likely a first inversion dominant chord (spelled B–D–G, from bottom note of the chord to the top).

Composers were inconsistent in the usages described below. Especially in the 17th century, the numbers were omitted whenever the composer thought the chord was obvious. Early composers such as Claudio Monteverdi often specified the octave by the use of compound intervals such as 10, 11, and 15.

=== Numbers ===
Common Conventional Symbols for Figured Bass
Triads
Inversion	Intervals above bass	Symbol	Example
Root position	^{5}_{3}	3	
1st inversion	^{6}_{3}	6	
2nd inversion	^{6}_{4}	^{6}_{4}	
Seventh chords
Inversion	Intervals above bass	Symbol	Example
Root position		7	
1st inversion		^{6}_{5}	
2nd inversion		^{4}_{3}	
3rd inversion		^{4}_{2} or 2	

Contemporary figured bass abbreviations for triads and seventh chords are shown in the table to the right.

The numbers indicate the number of scale steps above the given bass-line that a note should be played. For example:

Here, the bass note is a C, and the numbers 4 and 6 indicate that notes a fourth and a sixth above it should be played, that is an F and an A. In other words, the second inversion of an F major chord can be realized as:

In cases where the numbers 3 or 5 would normally be understood, these are usually left out. For example:

has the same meaning as

and can be realized as

although the performer may choose which octave to play the notes in and will often elaborate them in some way, such as by playing them as arpeggios rather than as block chords, or by adding improvised ornaments, depending on the tempo and texture of the music.

Sometimes, other numbers are omitted: a 2 on its own or ^{4}_{2} indicates, for example. From the figured bass-writer's perspective, this bass note is obviously a third inversion seventh chord, so the sixth interval is viewed as an interval that the player should automatically infer. In many cases entire figures can be left out, usually where the chord is obvious from the progression or the melody.

Sometimes the chord changes but the bass note itself is held. In these cases the figures for the new chord are written wherever in the bar they are meant to occur.

can be realized as

When the bass note changes but the notes in the chord above it are to be held, a line is drawn next to the figure or figures, for as long as the chord is to be held, to indicate this:

can be realized as

When the bass moves the chord intervals have effectively changed, in this case from ^{6}_{3} to ^{7}_{4}, but no additional numbers are written.

=== Accidentals ===
When an accidental is shown on its own without a number, it applies to the note a third above the lowest note; most commonly, this is the third of the chord. Otherwise, if a number is shown, the accidental affects the said interval. For example, this, showing the widespread default meaning of an accidental without number as applying to the third above the bass:

can be realized as

Sometimes the accidental is placed after the number rather than before it.

Alternatively, a cross placed next to a number indicates that the pitch of that note should be raised (augmented) by a semitone (so that if it is normally a flat it becomes a natural, and if it is normally a natural it becomes a sharp). A different way to indicate this is to draw a backslash through the number itself. The following three notations, therefore, all indicate the same thing:

can all be realized as

More rarely, a "forward" slash through a number indicates that a pitch is to be lowered (diminished) by a semitone:

can both be realized as

When sharps or flats are used with key signatures, they may have a slightly different meaning, especially in 17th-century music. A sharp might be used to cancel a flat in the key signature, or vice versa, instead of a natural sign.

=== Example in context ===
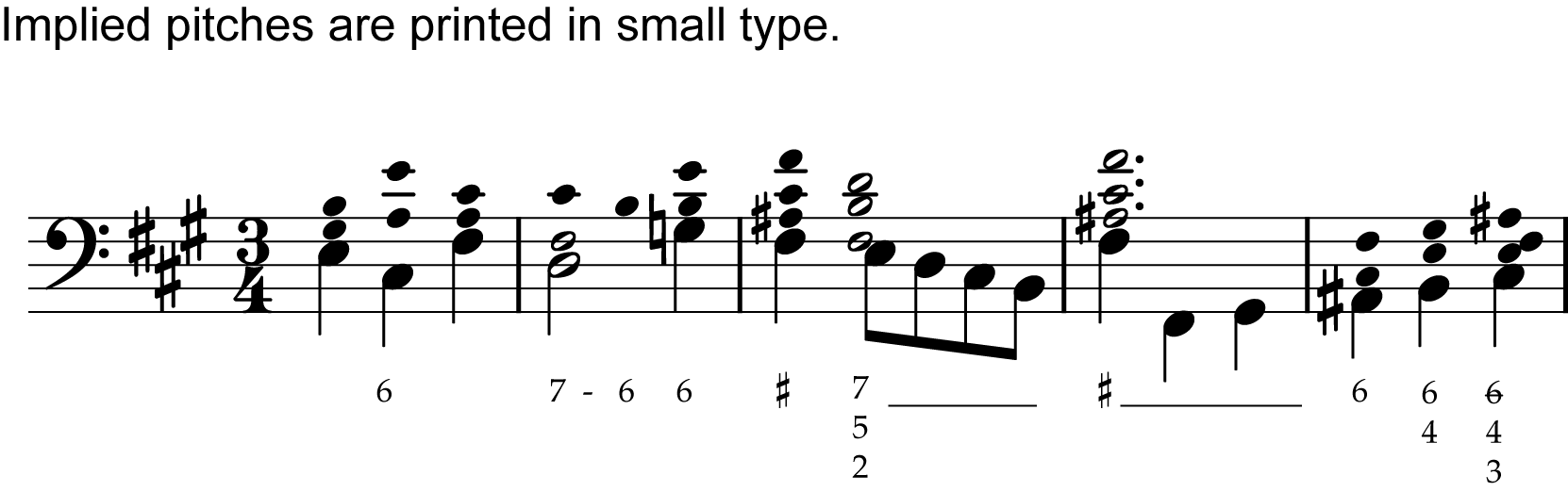
An example of figured bass in context. Taken from Beschränkt, ihr Weisen, by J. S. Bach (BWV 443).

== Contemporary uses ==
In the 20th and 21st century, figured bass is also sometimes used by classical musicians as a shorthand way of indicating chords when a composer is sketching out ideas for a new piece or when a music student is analyzing the harmony of a notated piece of music (e.g., a Bach chorale or a Chopin piano prelude). Figured bass is not generally used in modern musical compositions, except for neo-Baroque pieces.

In the 2000s, outside of professional Baroque ensembles that specialize in the performance practice of the Baroque era, the most common use of figured bass notation is to indicate the inversion in a harmonic analysis or composer's sketch context, however, often without the staff notation, using letter note names followed with the figure. For instance, if a piano piece had a C major triad in the right hand (C–E–G), with the bass note a G with the left hand, this would be a second inversion C major chord, which would be written G^{6}_{4}. If this same C major triad had an E in the bass, it would be a first inversion chord, which would be written E^{6}_{3} or E_{6} (this is different from the jazz notation, where a C^{6} means the added sixth chord C–E–G–A, i.e., a C major with an added 6th degree). The symbols can also be used with Roman numerals in analyzing functional harmony, a usage called figured Roman; see chord symbol.

A form of figured bass is used in notation of accordion music; another simplified form is used to notate guitar chords.

Robert Gjerdingen's study of galant schemata casts new light on historical music pedagogy and education and has sparked a renewed interest in the thoroughbass tradition, through which young students learned to improvise harmonies with valid voice leading by reading composed bass lines (also called partimenti) with didactic musical qualities.

== See also ==
- Realization (figured bass)
- Unfigured bass
