= Unfigured bass =

Musical notation

Unfigured bass, less commonly known as under-figured bass, is a kind of musical notation used during the Baroque music era in Western Classical music (ca. 1600–1750) in which a basso continuo performer playing a chordal instrument (e.g., harpsichord, organ, or lute) improvises a chordal accompaniment from a notated bass line which lacks the guidance of figures indicating which harmonies should be played above the bass note (see figured bass). Figured bass parts have numbers or accidentals above the bass line which indicate which intervals above the bass should be played in the chord. However, not all basso continuo parts from the Baroque period were figured.

== History ==
From the earliest days of thoroughbass, composers and copyists have been chastised for providing bass parts without any figures to guide performers. Despite perennial complaints, however, unfigured basses persisted right through the eighteenth century, though it is speculated that unfigured basses would not have existed if it were not for the suggestion of harmonies in bass lines of the time.

=== Performance ===
In the early baroque period published parts were as likely to be unfigured as figured, leading to unusual clashes of harmony on a first reading. In an effort to perform a piece the first time without such harmonic clashes, various methods were devised and used to anticipate the harmonic structure and progression of a piece. Among these are:

- Specific chords might be placed over a given solmization syllable, or an easily identified note, such as a sharped note.
- Specific chords might be applied to various patterns of bass intervals.
- Model bass lines with chords might be learned by rote to be used whenever applicable.
- Or specific chords might be placed over particular scale degrees.

=== Unfigured bass notes in an otherwise figured part ===
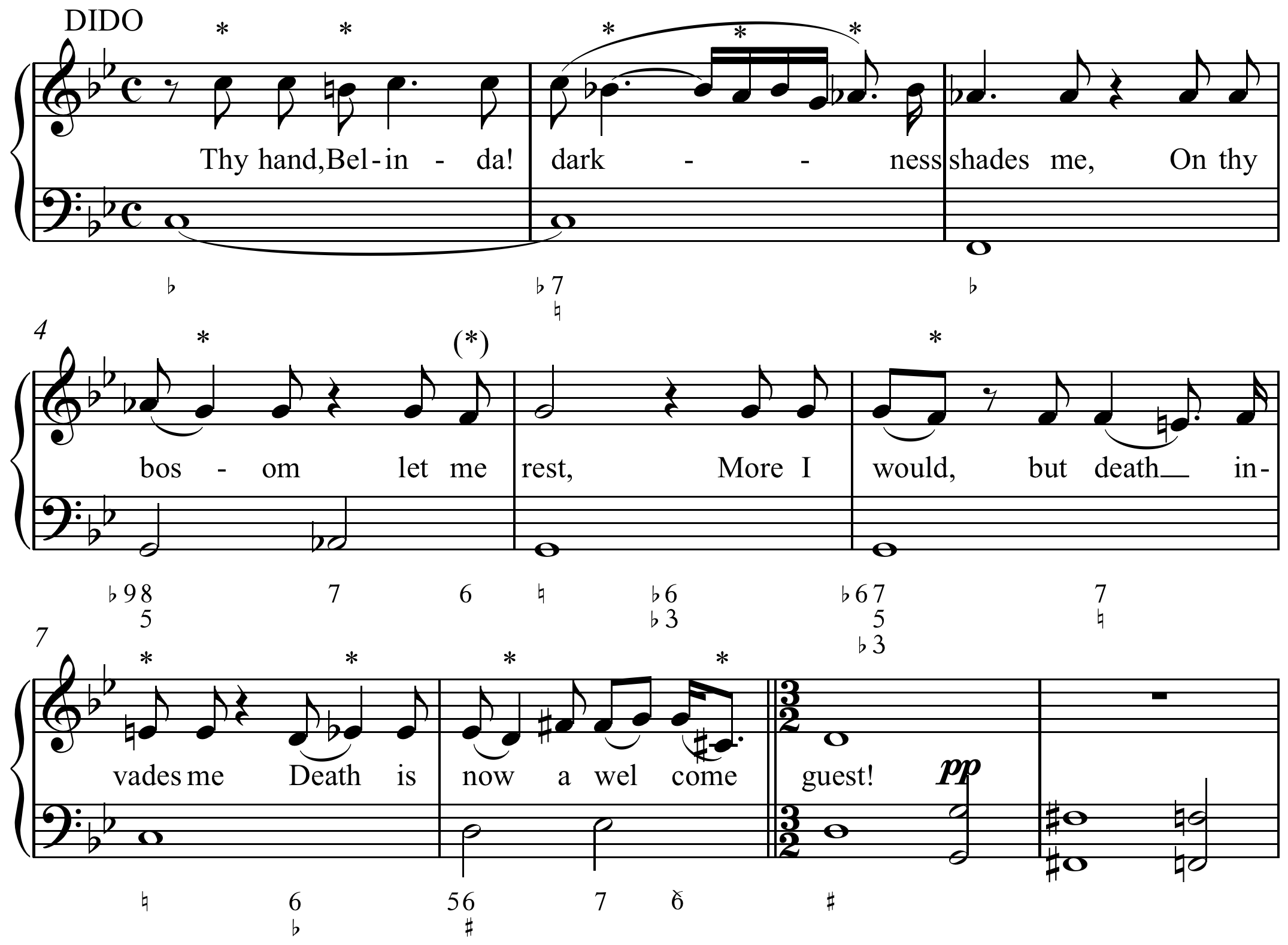
The recitative portion of this Purcell excerpt is mostly figured (i.e., almost every bass note has numbers and/or accidental symbols underneath it to indicate the harmony). The last three bass notes here (the first three notes of the subsequent aria) are unfigured. A continuo musician would then revert to deducing harmonies based on the scale function of each note, or not adding any harmonies (playing tasto solo) through the initial phrase.

In a figured bass part, not all bass notes were necessarily figured. By convention, bass notes of root-position chords (^{5}_{3}) were often left unfigured. Exceptions to this rule, however, abound, as in the Purcell excerpt shown here.

=== Pedagogy ===
Many music masters in the Baroque period educated students in the art of playing unfigured bass accompaniment fluently. Many pieces such as Partimenti were written for this purpose.

== See also ==
- Figured bass
