= Giorgio Sanguinetti =

Giorgio Sanguinetti is an Italian musicologist, music historian and music theorist. He is best known as the author of The Art of Partimento: History, Theory, and Practice, the first monograph dedicated to the history, theory, and practice of partimento instruction as practiced in the music conservatories of Naples from the end of the 17th century to the middle of the 19th century. Sanguinetti is full professor of theory and analysis of music at the University of Rome Tor Vergata.

== Education ==
Sanguinetti graduated in piano at the Milan Conservatory in 1976 and in music composition at the Conservatorio Statale di Musica "Gioachino Rossini" in 1993. Post-graduation, Sanguinetti studied piano with Vera Gobbi Belcredi, and music composition with Vieri Tosatti in Rome. In 1994, Sanguinetti studied Schenkerian analysis privately with Carl Schachter in New York.

== Awards ==
- Wallace Berry Award (2013) - The Art of Partimento

== Books ==
- Sanguinetti, Giorgio (May 24, 2012). The Art of Partimento: History, Theory, and Practice. Oxford University Press. ISBN 9780195394207.

== See also ==
- Partimento
- Music conservatories of Naples
- Robert Gjerdingen
