= Istanbul Mineral and Metals Exporters' Association =

The Istanbul Mineral and Metals Exporters' Association (IMMIB) (Turkish: İstanbul Maden ve Metaller İhracatçı Birlikleri) is a professional body which deals with all of the export activities at the export density regions of Istanbul. It is affiliated with the Undersecretariat for Foreign Trade of the office of the Prime Minister of Turkey. As of 2025 IMMIB's 25,300 members represented 34% of Turkey's total exports.

== Promotional activity ==
IMMIB has promoted Turkish stone as a product and was represented at Coverings 2004 with a major display.

== Organisation ==
IMMIB is made up of six subsidiary associations, namely:

- Istanbul Mineral Exporters' Association
- Istanbul Ferrous and Non-Ferrous Metals Exporters' Association
- Istanbul Chemicals and Chemical Products Exporters' Association
- Istanbul Electrical, Electronics and Machinery Products Exporters' Association
- Istanbul Precious Minerals and Jewellery Exporters' Association
- Istanbul Iron and Steel Exporters' Association

== Objectives ==
The function and objectives of Istanbul Mineral and Metals Exporters' Association are to:

- Maximise Turkey export potential by undertaking studies on harmonization of types, qualities and quantities of exportable products with importing countries' needs;
- Resolve problems faced by members arising from legal transactions;
- Register and record exportation in relevant sectors and to produce statistics based on these records;
- Prepare records and to make in-depth analysis of relevant sectors prepare market reports for selected markets and carry out R&D activities;
- Examine foreign trade regulations and laws of importer countries and keep member firms informed about international rules of arbitration;
- Organise seminars, fairs and exhibitions to introduce Turkish export products to world markets, produce documents concerning export operations and foster cooperation with other organisations considered key partners in achieving Association's objectives and organise trade missions to potential export markets and to bring buyer missions into Turkey in cooperation with Undersecretary for Foreign Trade;
- Prepare conferences and courses to inform exporters about the improvements.

Name of Association	Date of Establishment	Number of Members (14.01.2008)
Istanbul Mineral Exporters' Association	23.05.1976	3.444
Istanbul Ferrous and Non-Ferrous Metals Exporters' Association	06.12.1986	5.633
Istanbul Chemicals and Chemical Products Exporters' Association	02.09.1991	7.212
Istanbul Electrical, Electronics and Machinery Products Exporters' Association	02.09.1991	7.610
Istanbul Precious Minerals and Jewellery Exporters' Association	01.08.2003	1.018
Istanbul Iron and Steel Exporters' Association	20.10.2005	380
