= Rule of the octave =

Method of musical harmonization

The rule of the octave is a way of harmonizing each note of the diatonic scale, reflecting common practice, and has its origin in the practice of thorough bass, or basso continuo, where it provided an easy way to find which chord could accompany each note of the scale in the bass, particularly in the absence of figuring. The earliest description of the chords harmonizing an octave may be that by Antonio Bruschi in 1711. The name (règle des octaves, "rule of the octaves") was first given by François Campion in 1716. The rule of the octave also formed the cornerstone of the "regole" (rules) of partimento collections. There is normally a different harmonization for ascending and descending bass lines, and, although called a rule, there are several variants with different chords. Different versions for the major and minor scales are recorded. One example for the major scale by John Hiles, (this expansion of Hiles' line contains consecutive fifths of the second and third voices between the sixth and the seventh chords; which can, however, be avoided by crossing these voices e.g. in a choral version):

== See also ==
- Galant schemata
- Partimento
