= Tenor saxophone =

Type of saxophone

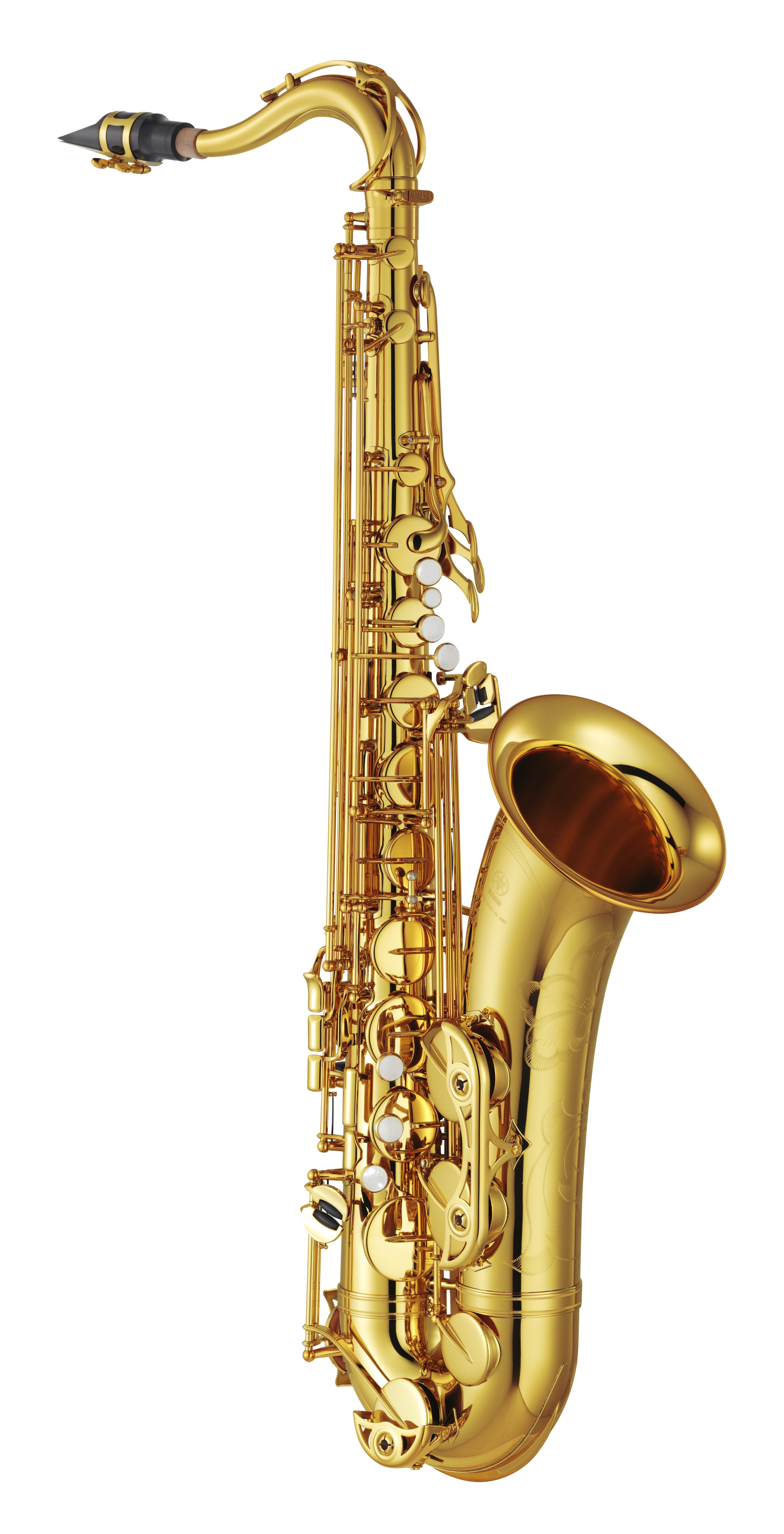
- Yamaha YTS-62 tenor saxophone

Woodwind instrument
- Classification: Single-reed
- Hornbostel–Sachs classification: 422.212-71 (Single-reed aerophone with keys)
- Inventor: Adolphe Sax
- Developed: 1840s

Playing range
- The tenor saxophone in B♭ sounds an octave and a major second lower than written. Many models have a high F♯ key, and higher pitches are possible using altissimo fingerings.

Related instruments
- Sizes: Soprillo; Sopranino; Soprano; Alto; Tenor; Baritone; Bass; Contrabass; Subcontrabass; Orchestral saxophones: C soprano; Mezzo-soprano; C melody; Specialty saxophones: Aulochrome; Tubax

Musicians
- See list of saxophonists

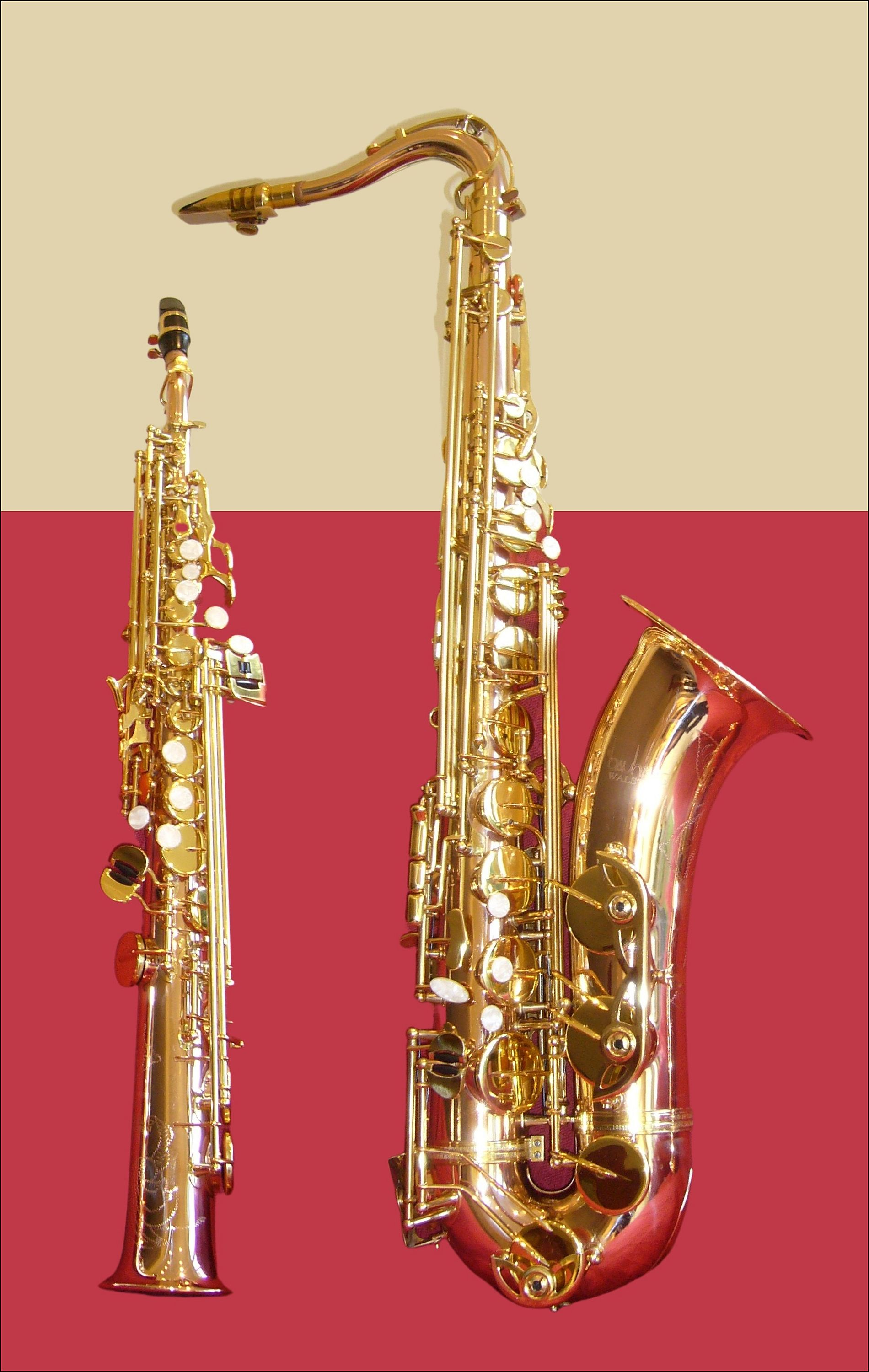
Tenor (right) and soprano saxophones, showing their comparative sizes

The tenor saxophone is a medium-sized member of the saxophone family, a group of instruments invented by Adolphe Sax in the 1840s. The tenor and the alto are the two most commonly used saxophones. The tenor is pitched in the key of B♭ (while the alto is pitched in the key of E♭), and is a transposing instrument in the treble clef, sounding an octave and a major second lower than the written pitch. Modern tenor saxophones that have a high F♯ key have a range from A♭_{2} to E_{5} (concert) and are therefore pitched one octave below the soprano saxophone. People who play the tenor saxophone are known as "tenor saxophonists", "tenor sax players", or "saxophonists".

The tenor saxophone uses a larger mouthpiece, reed and ligature than the alto and soprano saxophones. Visually, it is easily distinguished by the curve in its neck, or its crook, near the mouthpiece. The alto saxophone lacks this and its neck goes straight to the mouthpiece. The tenor saxophone is most recognized for its ability to blend well with the soprano, alto, and baritone saxophones, with its "husky" yet "bright" tone.

The tenor sax has been an important solo instrument in jazz music. Famous and influential players include Coleman Hawkins, Lester Young, John Coltrane, Ben Webster, Johnny Griffin, Dexter Gordon, Wardell Gray, Stan Getz, Sonny Rollins and Wayne Shorter. The work of younger players such as Michael Brecker and Chris Potter has been an important influence in more recent jazz.

== History ==
The tenor saxophone is one of a family of fourteen instruments designed and constructed in 1846 by Adolphe Sax, a Belgian-born instrument maker, flautist and clarinetist. Based on an amalgam of ideas drawn from the clarinet, flute, oboe and ophicleide, the saxophone was intended to form a tonal link between the woodwinds and brass instruments found in military bands, an area that Sax considered sorely lacking. Sax's patent, granted on 28 June 1846, divided the family into two groups of seven instruments, each ranging from soprano down to contrabass. One family, pitched alternatively in B♭ and E♭, was designed specifically to integrate with the other instruments then common in military bands. The tenor saxophone, pitched in B♭, is the fourth member of this family.

== Description ==
The tenor saxophone, like all saxophones, consists of an approximately conical tube of thin brass, a type of metal. The wider end of the tube is flared slightly to form a bell, while the narrower end is connected to a single reed mouthpiece similar to that of the clarinet. At intervals down the bore is placed between 20 and 23 tone holes; these are covered by pads which can be pressed onto the holes to form an airtight seal. There are also two small speaker holes which, when opened, disrupt the lower harmonics of the instrument and cause it to overblow into an upper register. The pads are controlled by pressing several keys with the fingers of the left and right hands; the left thumb controls an octave key which opens one or other of the speaker holes. The original design of the tenor saxophone had a separate octave key for each speaker hole, in the manner of the bassoon; the mechanism by which the correct speaker hole is selected based on the fingering of the left hand (specifically the left ring finger) was developed soon after Sax's patent expired in 1866.

Although a handful of novelty tenors have been constructed 'straight', like the smaller members of the saxophone family, the unwieldy length of the straight configuration means that almost all tenor saxophones feature a 'U-bend' above the third-lowest tone hole which is characteristic of the saxophone family. The tenor saxophone is also curved at the top, above the highest tone hole but below the highest speaker hole. While the alto is usually bent only through 80–90° to make the mouthpiece fit more easily in the mouth, the tenor is usually bent a little more in this section, incorporating a slight S-bend.

The mouthpiece of the tenor saxophone is very similar to that of the clarinet: an approximately wedge-shaped tube, open along one face and covered in use by a thin strip of material prepared from the stem of the giant cane (Arundo donax) commonly known as a reed. The reed is shaved to come to an extremely thin point and is clamped over the mouthpiece by the use of a ligature. When air is blown through the mouthpiece, the reed vibrates and generates the acoustic resonances required to produce a sound from the instrument. The mouthpiece is the area of the saxophone with the greatest flexibility in shape and style, so the timbre of the instrument is primarily determined by the dimensions of its mouthpiece. The design of the mouthpiece and reed plays a big role in how a saxophone sounds. Classical mouthpieces generally help produce a warmer and rounder tone, while jazz mouthpieces generally help produce a brighter and edgier tone. Materials used in mouthpiece construction include plastic, ebonite and various metals, for example bronze, brass and stainless steel.

The mouthpiece of the tenor saxophone is proportionally larger than that of the alto, necessitating a similarly larger reed. The increased stiffness of the reed and the greater airflow required to establish resonance in the larger body means the tenor sax requires greater lung power but a looser embouchure than the higher-pitched members of the saxophone family. The tenor sax reed is similar in size to that used in the bass clarinet, and the two can be easily substituted.

== Uses ==
The tenor saxophone first gained popularity in one of its original intended roles: the military band. Soon after its invention, French and Belgian military bands began to take full advantage of the instrument that Sax had designed specifically for them. Modern military bands typically incorporate a quartet of saxophone players playing the E♭ baritone, tenor, E♭ alto and B♭ soprano. British military bands customarily make use only of the tenor and alto saxes, with two or more musicians on each instrument.

The tenor is used in classical music. It is a standard instrument in concert bands and saxophone quartets. It also has a body of solo repertoire. The tenor is sometimes used as a member of the orchestra in pieces such as Sergei Prokofiev's "Romeo and Juliet" and "Lieutenant Kijé Suite" and Maurice Ravel's "Boléro". Charles Ives employs a tenor in his Fourth Symphony. Vincent d'Indy wrote for a tenor in his opera Fervaal. Lukas Foss includes a tenor in his Symphony No. 2. Béla Bartók used the tenor and other saxes in his ballet The Wooden Prince. Igor Stravinsky has two tenors performing in his Ebony Concerto.

Much of the popularity of saxophones in the United States derives from the large number of military bands that were around at the time of the American Civil War. After the war, former military band instruments found their way into the hands of the general public, where they were often used to play gospel music and jazz. The work of the pioneering bandleader Patrick Gilmore (1829–1892) was highly influential; he was one of the first arrangers to pit brass instruments (trumpet, trombone and cornet) against reeds (clarinet and saxophone) in a manner that has now become the norm for big-band arrangements.

The tenor saxophone became best known to the general public through its frequent use in jazz music. It was the pioneering genius of Coleman Hawkins in the 1930s that lifted the tenor saxophone from its traditional role of adding weight to the ensemble and established it as a highly effective melody instrument in its own right. Many innovative jazz musicians from the 1930s onwards have been tenor saxophone players. The strong resonant sound of Hawkins and his followers was in contrast with the lighter approach of Lester Young and his school. During the bebop years, the most prominent tenor sounds in jazz were those of the Four Brothers in the Woody Herman orchestra, including Stan Getz who in the 1960s went on to great popular success playing the Brazilian bossa nova sound on tenor saxophone (not forgetting John Coltrane, Dexter Gordon and Sonny Rollins). In recent years, the tenor continues to be very popular with fans of smooth jazz music, being played by artists such as Kirk Whalum, Richard Elliot, Steve Cole and Jessy J. Saxophonists Ron Holloway and Karl Denson are two of the major proponents of the tenor on the jam band music scene. Van Morrison learned music notation and tenor saxophone lessons from his fellow Hyndford Street neighbour, jazz musician George Cassidy, who specialised in tenor saxophone. Morrison and Cassidy bonded over this, becoming great friends.

Former president Bill Clinton has played the tenor saxophone for much of his life. He received a special-edition saxophone while in office.

As a result of its prominence in American jazz, the instrument has also featured prominently in other genres. The tenor is common in rhythm and blues music and has a part to play in rock and roll and more recent rock music as well as African American, Latin American, Afro-Caribbean, and African music.

== See also ==
- C-melody saxophone – a smaller tenor saxophone in the key of C
- Soprano saxophone – pitched above the alto saxophone
- Alto saxophone – pitched between the tenor and soprano saxophone
- Baritone saxophone – pitched below the tenor saxophone
