= John A. Rice (musicologist) =

John A. Rice is an American musicologist. Born in 1956, he studied music history at the University of California, Berkeley (Ph.D., 1987). After many years of research on eighteenth-century opera and musical patronage, more recently he has divided his attention between Galant Schemata (inspired by Robert Gjerdingen's Music in the Galant Style) and Renaissance music and musical iconography. His research has yielded several books and over fifty articles. He curates the Youtube channel Settecentista.

Rice has taught at the University of Washington, Colby College, the University of Houston, the University of Texas at Austin, the University of Pittsburgh and the University of Michigan. He has received grants from the Alexander von Humboldt Foundation, the National Endowment for the Humanities, and the American Philosophical Society.

Rice is a member of the Akademie für Mozart-Forschung in Salzburg and former president of the Mozart Society of America

== Books ==
- W. A. Mozart, La clemenza di Tito. Cambridge : Cambridge Univ. Press (1991)
- Antonio Salieri and Viennese Opera. Chicago [u.a.] : Univ. of Chicago Press (1998)
- Empress Marie Therese and music at the Viennese Court, 1792 - 1807 Cambridge : Cambridge Univ. Press (2003)
- The Temple of Night at Schönau, architecture, music, and theater in a late eighteenth-century Viennese garden. Philadelphia, PA; American Philosophical Society (2006)
- Mozart on the Stage. Cambridge Univ. Press (2009).
- (ed.) Irving Godt's Marianna Martines: A Woman Composer in the Vienna of Mozart and Haydn. Rochester: University of Rochester Press (2010)
- Music in the Eighteenth Century. New York: Norton (2012), with accompanying anthology ("Western Music in Context")
- Saint Cecilia in the Renaissance: The Emergence of a Musical Icon. Chicago: University of Chicago Press, 2022

== Honors ==
- Rice's book Antonio Salieri and Viennese Opera received the Kinkeldey Award from the American Musicological Society.
