= Giovanni Furno =

Italian composer and music teacher

Giovanni Furno (Capua, January 1, 1748 – Naples, June 20, 1837) was an Italian composer and famous music teacher. Among his students were Vincenzo Bellini and Saverio Mercadante. He was unanimously considered the best teacher in Naples. His primer on partimenti, called Easy, short, and plain method of the first and essential rules for the accompaniment of unfigured partimenti was an extremely popular textbook and was reprinted many times.

He composed two operas, a Miserere, a symphony and other works for orchestra.
