= Basso continuo =

Baroque musical accompaniment

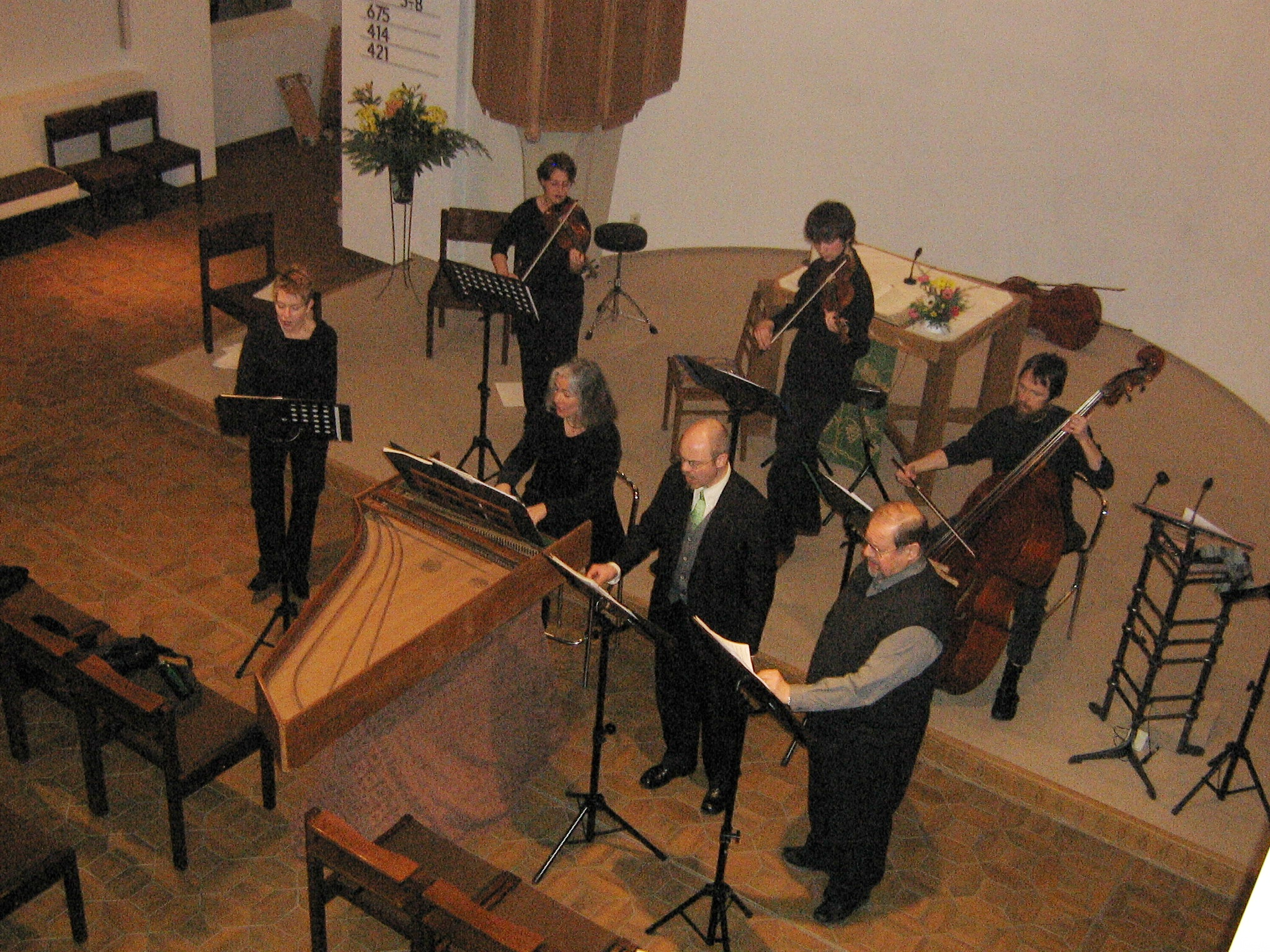
A harpsichordist and a bassist play continuo for a small group of singers (the solo ensemble of the Kreuznacher Diakonie Choir).

Basso continuo is a harmonic musical structure, almost universal in the Baroque era (1600–1750), that generally consisted of a bassline and a chord progression. The phrase is often shortened to continuo, and the instrumentalists playing the continuo part are called the continuo group.

== Forces ==
The composition of the continuo group is often left to the discretion of the performers (or, for a large performance, the conductor), and practice varied enormously within the Baroque period. At least one instrument capable of playing chords must be included, such as a harpsichord, organ, lute, theorbo, guitar, regal, or harp. In addition, any number of instruments that play in the bass register may be included, such as cello, double bass, bass viol, or bassoon. In modern performances of chamber works, the most common combination is harpsichord and cello for instrumental works and secular vocal works, such as operas, and organ and cello for sacred music. A double bass may be added, particularly when accompanying a lower-pitched solo voice (e.g., a bass singer).

In larger orchestral works, typically performers match the instrument families used in the full ensemble: including bassoon when the work includes oboes or other woodwinds, but restricting it to cello or double bass if only strings are involved; although occasionally individual movements of suites deviate from this at the musical director's discretion (e.g. bassoon without oboes). Harps, lutes, and other handheld instruments are more typical of early 17th-century music. Sometimes instruments are specified by the composer: in L'Orfeo (1607) Monteverdi calls for an exceptionally varied instrumentation, with multiple harpsichords and lutes with a bass violin in the pastoral scenes followed by lamenting to the accompaniment of organo di legno and chitarrone, while Charon stands watch to the sound of a regal. Contrabassoon is rare as a continuo instrument, but is often used in J. S. Bach's Johannespassion which calls for "bassono grosso".

The keyboard (or other chord-playing instrument) player realizes (that is, adds in an improvised fashion) a continuo part by playing, in addition to the notated bass line, the figured bass notation above it to complete chords, either determined ahead of time or improvised in performance. This serves as a model for harmonisation but performers are also expected to use their musical judgment and the other instruments or voices (notably the lead melody and any accidentals that might be present in it) as a guide. Experienced players may sometimes incorporate motives found in the other instrumental parts into their improvised chordal accompaniment. Modern editions of such music usually supply a realized keyboard part, fully written out in staff notation for a player, in place of improvisation. With the rise in historically informed performance, however, the number of performers who are able to improvise their parts from the figures, as Baroque players would have done, has increased.

== Notation ==
Chord-playing continuo instrument parts are often written in figured bass. A part so annotated consists of a bass line in notes on a musical staff plus numbers and accidentals (or in some cases (back)slashes added to a number) beneath the staff to indicate what intervals above the bass notes should be played, and therefore which inversions of which chords are to be played.

The phrase tasto solo indicates that only the bass line (without any upper chords) is to be played for a short period, usually until the next figure is encountered. This instructs the chord-playing instrumentalist not to play any improvised chords for a period. The reason tasto solo had to be specified was because it was an accepted convention that if no figures were present in a section of otherwise figured bass line, the chord-playing performer would either assume that it was a root-position triad, or deduce from the harmonic motion that another figure was implied. For example, if a continuo part in the key of C begins with a C bass note in the first measure, which descends to a B♮ in the second measure, even in the absence of figures, the chord-playing instrumentalist would know to play a first inversion V chord (spelled B–D–G, from bottom note of the chord to the top).

== History ==
Basso continuo, though an essential structural and identifying element of the Baroque period, continued to be used in many works, mostly (but not limited to) sacred choral works, of the classical period (up to around 1800). An example is C. P. E. Bach's Concerto in D minor for flute, strings and basso continuo. Examples of its use in the 19th century are rarer, but they do exist: masses by Anton Bruckner, Ludwig van Beethoven, and Franz Schubert, for example, have a basso continuo part that was for an organist.

== See also ==
- Comping, a similar type of accompaniment in jazz music
- Realization (figured bass), the art of creating an accompaniment from figured bass
