= Harmonization =

Chordal accompaniment to a line or melody

Two harmonizations of "Yankee Doodle"

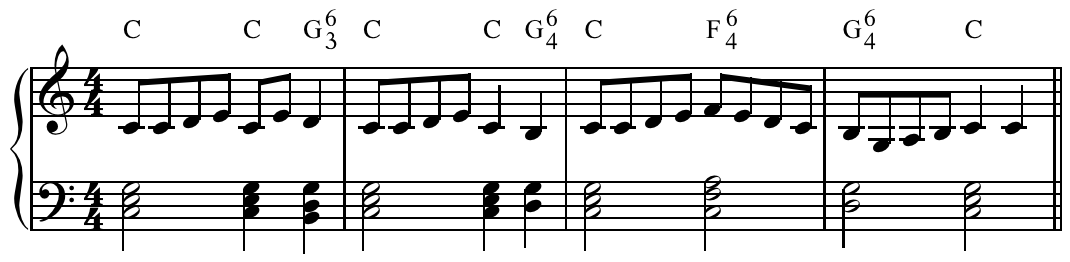
One harmonization.

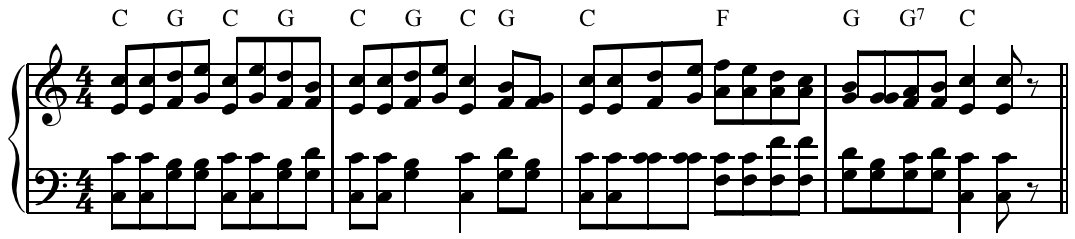
Another harmonization.

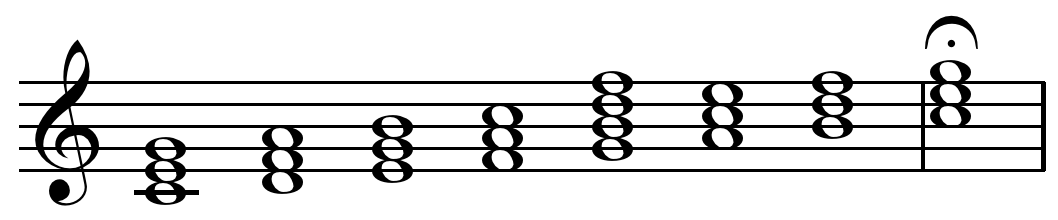
Harmonised C major scale: I, ii, iii, IV, V7, vi, vii^{o}.

In music, harmonization (or harmonisation) is the chordal accompaniment to a line or melody: "Using chords and melodies together, making harmony by stacking scale tones as triads".

A harmonized scale (or harmonised scale) can be created by using each note of a musical scale as a root note for a chord and then by taking other tones within the scale building the rest of a chord.
For example, using an Ionian (major scale)

- the root note would become the I major chord,
- the second note the ii minor chord,
- the third note the iii minor chord,
- the fourth note the IV major chord,
- the fifth note the V major chord (or even a dominant 7th),
- the sixth note the vi minor chord,
- the seventh note the vii diminished chord and
- the octave would be a I major chord.

Using the minor (aeolian mode) one would have:

- i minor,
- ii diminished,
- (♭)III major,
- iv minor,
- v minor,
- (♭)VI major,
- (♭)VII major and
- the i minor an octave higher.

== Reharmonization ==
Reharmonization (or reharmonisation) is the technique of taking an existing melodic line and altering the harmony that accompanies it. Typically, a melody is reharmonized to provide musical interest or variety.

=== Reharmonising a melody ===
A melodic tone can often be harmonized in a variety of different ways. For example, an E might be harmonized with an E major chord (E – G♯ – B). In this case, the melodic tone is acting as the root of the chord. That same E might be harmonized with a C major chord (C – E – G), making it the third of the chord. This concept extends to ninths (E would act as the 9th if harmonized with a Dm7 chord – D – F – A – C – E), ♯fifths (E would act as ♯5 on an A♭ augmented chord – A♭ – C – E), and a wide array of other options.

Typically however, reharmonizations involve not just a single melody note, but a melodic line. As a result, there are often several melodic tones which might occur over a harmony, and all of these must be considered when reharmonizing.

For example, if a melody composed of E♭ – F and G was originally harmonized with E♭maj7, choosing D7 as the reharmonization chord might not be the best choice, since each melodic tone would create semitone or minor 9th dissonance with chord members of the supporting harmony. Experienced arrangers might decide to use these kinds of highly dissonant chords when reharmonizing, however handling this dissonance requires a good ear and a deep understanding of harmony.

=== Jazz reharmonisation ===
In jazz, the term is typically used to refer to the process of reharmonising some or all of a tune, whereby an existing melody is refitted with a new chord progression. Jazz musicians often take the melody from a well-known standard and alter the changes to make the tune sound more contemporary or progressive. Art Tatum was a pioneer of reharmonization, and later on John Coltrane, Miles Davis and Bill Evans were among the first to seriously explore its possibilities, and since then the technique has become an essential tool for the jazz musician and jazz arranger.

==== Chord substitution ====
One of the most common techniques in jazz reharmonisation is the use of substitute chords, through a technique known as tritone substitution. In tritone substitution, a dominant chord is replaced by another dominant chord a tritone above its tonic. This technique is based on the fact that the third and seventh degrees of a dominant chord are enharmonically the same as the seventh and third degrees of the dominant chord a tritone away. For example, B and F, the third and seventh of a G7 chord, are enharmonic equivalents of C♭ and F, the seventh and third of a D♭7 chord. Since the tritone is a distinguishing feature of the sound of a dominant 7th chord, a D♭7 chord may thus replace G7.

Tritone substitution works very well on standards, because the chord progressions typically utilize the II – V–I progression and the circle of fifths. For example, a jazz standard using a chord progression of Dm7 – G7 – Cmaj7 could easily be reharmonized to Dm7 – D♭7 – Cmaj7, (G7 is replaced with the dominant 7th chord a tritone away, D♭7). The new progression has a more contemporary sound, with chromatic bass motion and smooth voice leading in the upper parts.

Tritone substitution is also possible with major seventh chords, for example Dm7 – G7 – Cmaj7 could become Dm7 – D♭maj7 – Cmaj7. Thad Jones sometimes uses this type of substitution in his big band writing.

As opposed to the classical approach to tonal harmony, in jazz there are only three functions: tonic, subdominant and dominant. Therefore, chords can also be substituted for congruent functions: for example, the second degree can be substituted for the fourth degree, the tonic can be substituted for the sixth/third degree and so on. The fourth degree in major may be substituted for a seventh chord to create a "bluesy" sound. In a progression going up a fourth, if the first chord is a minor seventh chord, it can also be substituted for a seventh chord; a relative second degree can also be added before it to create a ii–V–I turnaround. (A sole minor seventh or seventh chord can be perceived as a second degree or its dominant quality substitution, in which case a fifth may follow.) In the same progression, chord qualities are sometimes flexible: the ♭IImaj7 chord mentioned in the previous paragraph may get a preceding ♭VImaj7 chord instead of the relative II or its tritone substitution.

Combining the above techniques, the following progression:

C     | Am7      | Dm7    | G7            | C ||

can turn into

E7 A7 | Bbm7 Eb7 | D7  F7 | Abmaj7 Dbmaj7 | C ||

==== Planing ====
Planing is a reharmonization technique used by both improvisers and arrangers. It refers to the technique of sliding a chord (or chord tone) up or down, either chromatically or a tritone apart, maintaining the shape and voicing of the chord, at times resolving to the original chord. For example, F7 (F – A – C – E♭) could slide up to become G♭7 (G♭ - B♭ - D♭ - F♭), thus "planing" each note up a semitone. The planed chords can be further embellished: for example, if a D major is planed down a semitone, a minor seventh can be added to the resulting chord, C♯; as a dominant chord assumed to be the fifth degree of the momentarily tonicized F♯ major, it can have a second degree added to it, thus creating an incomplete ii-V-I turnaround which may or may not resolve to the original chord: G♯m7 C♯7 | (D)

Planing is often used by jazz arrangers to reharmonise melodic passing tones which, if voiced as a vertical sonority, might clash with the prevailing harmony in the progression. As well, a number of improvisers have used planing effectively, typically as part of a progression. Herbie Hancock uses improvised planing on his tune "Chameleon", on his 1973 Head Hunters record; McCoy Tyner uses it extensively (specifically, pentatonic scales located a tritone apart) in his recordings with John Coltrane, most notably "A Love Supreme", as well as in his own albums of the same period.

==== Multi-tonic systems ====
A concept introduced by Joseph Schillinger and Nicolas Slonimsky, the idea of multiple tonics derived from equal division of the octave appealed to John Coltrane, who proceeded to compose the groundbreaking tune "Giant Steps". The composition features a series of dominant chords and ii-V-I turnarounds resolving to three tonalities built on the B augmented triad (the three-tonic system):

B  D7  | G    Bb7 | Eb | Am7  D7  |
G  Bb7 | Eb   Gb7 | Cb | Fm7  Bb7 |
Eb     | Am7  D7  | G  | C#m7 F#7 |
B      | E#m7 A#7 | D# | C#m7 F#7 || (B)

The harmonic structure of Giant Steps was unfamiliar territory for many jazz musicians at the time, including Tommy Flanagan, the pianist on the original 1959 recording. The relative minimalism of his solo on the tune (compared with the density of Coltrane's) is considered by many to be an indication that he was not yet comfortable improvising on such a structure, even given his extensive experience within the jazz idiom. Developing the technique further, Coltrane started utilizing the three-tonic system (and later, the four-tonic system as well, which is based on tonics derived from a diminished seventh chord) as a reharmonization tool, which has ultimately become known as "Coltrane changes". In this example from "Countdown" (which is really a "Coltrane changes" version of "Tune Up", the well-known jazz standard composed by Miles Davis), the long ii-V-I in the key of D major is laced with V-I progressions that resolve to the three tonics of the D augmented triad:

original (Tune Up):

Em7    | A7     | D     | D |

reharmonised (Countdown):

Em7 F7 | Bb Db7 | Gb A7 | D |

This kind of reharmonisation mostly requires alteration of the original melody because of the frequent modulations and therefore, becomes "reharmonisation of the changes" rather than the classic concept of re-harmonising the melody.

== See also ==
- Chord progression
- Harmonic rhythm
- Rule of the octave
- Traditional sub-Saharan African harmony
