= Society for Music Theory =

American music theory organization

- Formation: October 19, 1977; 49 years ago
- Purpose: "Promotes the development of and engagement with music theory as a scholarly and pedagogical discipline"
- Headquarters: Jacobs School of Music, Indiana
- Website: societymusictheory.org

The Society for Music Theory (SMT) is an American organization devoted to the promotion, development and engagement of music theory as a scholarly and pedagogical discipline. Founded in 1977 by a group of distinguished theorists, among them Allen Forte and Wallace Berry, its members are primarily theorists in North American academic institutions and as of 2023 number over 1200. Among the SMT's publications are the Music Theory Spectrum and Music Theory Online journals, as well as the SMT Newsletter.

A member of the American Council of Learned Societies since 2000, the society's formation inspired the formation of similar organizations across the world. The SMT has a close relationship for the American Musicological Society; many members are in both, particularly during the SMT's early history. The SMT is based at the Jacobs School of Music of Indiana University Bloomington.

== Overview ==
In the 1970s, few schools had dedicated music theory programs, many music theorists had been trained as composers or historians, and there was a belief among theorists that the teaching of music theory was inadequate and that the subject was not properly recognized as a scholarly discipline in its own right. A growing number of scholars began promoting the idea that music theory should be taught by theorists, rather than composers, performers or music historians. In the words of Richmond Browne, a founding member of the Society and its first secretary, "Our goal was to create a profession." After a number of more informal discussions, there were two National Conferences on Music Theory, the first in 1976 in Boston and the second on October 19, 1977, at Northwestern University in Evanston, Illinois. While organizers were wary about collecting enough momentum, three hundred scholars turned up for the Evanston meeting, and the society was founded with an initial membership including almost 500 theorists. The name of the new organization was suggested by Maury Yeston, then of the Yale faculty, in the form of a motion that was passed unanimously.

The first President of the Society was Allen Forte, whose work developing set theory for the analysis of atonal music made him a leading voice in music scholarship at the time. The first official annual meeting of the society was in 1978 in Minneapolis. A year later, in 1979, the Society published the first issue of Music Theory Spectrum, the official journal of the Society and now a leading publication in the field of music theory. In 1993, the Society began experimenting with online publishing, and in 1995 the first volume of Music Theory Online was published. Music Theory Spectrum is a print journal distributed to subscribers, whereas Music Theory Online is free and published on the Society's website. Both journals are peer-reviewed, and regularly feature the work of prominent scholars in the field. Founding member and composer Margaret Vardell Sandresky was the first woman to publish in Music Theory Spectrum, and the first woman to present at a National Conference in Music Theory in 1977.

Since its foundation, the society has had a significant impact in many other countries, contributing to the establishment of similar societies in France (1985), Belgium (1989), Italy (1989), the United Kingdom (1991), Croatia (1997), the Netherlands (1999), Germany (2000), South Korea (2005) and Russia (2011).

The Society for Music Theory offers several annual awards that recognize recent publications of outstanding merit in the field of music theory. In 1986, the society began awarding a "Young Scholar" award to scholars under the age of 40 or within 5 years of receipt of their PhD degree, as well as an "Outstanding Publication" award given to distinguished research by a scholar of any age. In 1991, after the death of prominent scholar Wallace Berry, who was a founding officer and former president of the SMT (1982-1985), an award was named in his honor to recognize a distinguished book by any scholar, after which the "Outstanding Publication" award was only given for journal articles. In 1999, the "Young Scholar" award was re-titled the "Emerging Scholar" award. The society also occasionally presents a "Citation of Special Merit" for reference works, translations, edited volumes, or scholarly editions of music scores that are deemed to be of extraordinary value to the discipline.

As of 2023, the society has over 1200 members, most of whom are based in higher education institutions of North America, though there is "a small percentage of foreign members".
