= Tasto solo =

Musical notation

Tasto solo is an Italian term used in music scores, usually on the continuo part, to indicate that a note or section should be played on its own, without harmony. The term tasto is Italian for key (as Italian "tastiera" is for fingerboard), so the part is to be played solo by the fingerboard instrument (e.g. cello) and not by the harmony instrument (e.g. harpsichord) where a basso continuo line is played by more than one instrument. The phrase first appeared in music theory books in the eighteenth century, but was used by composers such as Arcangelo Corelli before this time. C.P.E. Bach commented that, in practice, Italians did not play tasto solo. The term is also used in the Introit section of W.A. Mozart's Requiem in D minor, K. 626, signaling the continuo players should only play the note, without the implied harmony.
