= Robert Gjerdingen =

Robert O. Gjerdingen is a scholar of music theory and music perception, and is an emeritus professor at Northwestern University. His most influential work focuses on the application of ideas from cognitive science, especially theories about schemas, as an analytical tool in an attempted "archaeology" of style and composition methods in galant European music of the eighteenth century. Gjerdingen received his PhD from the University of Pennsylvania in 1984 after studying with Leonard B. Meyer and Eugene Narmour. His 2007 book Music in the Galant Style, an authoritative study on galant schemata, received the Wallace Berry award from the Society for Music Theory in 2009 and has become influential in the field of music theory. Gjerdingen was also editor of the journal Music Perception from 1998 to 2002.

== Publications ==
- Child Composers in the Old Conservatories: How Orphans Became Elite Musicians. (New York: Oxford University Press, 2020).
- Music in the Galant Style: Being an Essay on Various Schemata Characteristic of Eighteenth-Century Music for Courtly Chambers, Chapels, and Theaters, Including Tasteful Passages of Music Drawn from Most Excellent Chapel Masters in the Employ of Noble and Noteworthy Personages, Said Music All Collected for the Reader’s Delectation on the World Wide Web (New York: Oxford University Press, 2007).
- Studies on the Origin of Harmonic Tonality [an English translation of Carl Dahlhaus's Untersuchungen über die Entstehung der harmonischen Tonalität ] (Princeton: Princeton University Press, 1990).
- A Classic Turn of Phrase: Music and the Psychology of Convention (Philadelphia: University of Pennsylvania Press, 1988).

In addition to these monographs, Gjerdingen has also edited two volumes of historical partimenti by Italian composers who taught at the conservatories in Naples.
