= Wallace Berry =

American music theorist and composer (1928–1991)

Wallace Berry (10 January 1928 – 16 November 1991) was an American music theorist and composer who taught at the University of Michigan and later at the University of British Columbia. Mid-way through his career, Berry shifted focus from music composition, and became a leading figure in the research and teaching of music theory.

== Life and career ==
Berry was born in La Crosse, Wisconsin.

Berry was educated at the University of Southern California (BMus 1949, PhD 1956), where he studied with Halsey Stevens. His composition Spoon River, on texts by Edgar Lee Masters (1952), won him national recognition. In 1953-54, he studied under Nadia Boulanger in Paris. He taught at the University of Michigan (1957–77), becoming chair of music theory in 1968. He was chair of the music department in the University of British Columbia from 1978–84, and thereafter taught theory.

Berry was the founding Vice President of the Society for Music Theory from 1977-1982, and then became the society's president from 1982-85. Berry was awarded the Society for Music Theory's "Outstanding Publication" Award posthumously in 1992 for his book Musical Structure and Performance. Berry's papers are deposited at the Library and Archives of Canada.

== Research ==
Berry's music theory research and publication focuses on musical form, beginning with a traditional textbook Form in Music (1966; 2d edition 1986). In two subsequent books, Structural Functions in Music (1976) and Musical Structure and Performance (1989) Berry identifies different formal functions and examines how these functions can be created by combinations of pitch, textural, and rhythmic-metric elements. The three chapters of Structural Functions in Music thus are titled "Tonality," "Texture," and "Rhythm and Meter." Reviewing Musical Structure and Performance, music theorist Rebecca Jemian characterizes the primary focus of Berry's work as an investigation into structural processes in music: "The various structural elements [of a piece], which include introduction, exposition, transition, development, and closure, are characterized by different functions; these diverse functions work to shape the musical whole. Circumstances of progression, recession, or stasis also contribute to musical shaping."

The clearest and most concise presentation of Berry's theoretical ideas is the article "Metric and Rhythmic Articulation in Music." The different musical elements create hierarchical streams that interact in cumulative processes of progression - accent - recession, where progression leads toward an accent and recession moves away from an accent. "Rhythm" thus refers to the individual streams, "meter" to their cumulative effects. As Berry puts it, "In thus suggesting that there are many interacting or cohering streams of rhythm in any individual structure, one acknowledges as well some ultimate rhythmic composite of all events. . . . Meter I regard as [arising from] such a punctuation of time."

== Wallace Berry Award ==
After Berry's death in 1991, the Society for Music Theory established the "Wallace Berry Award," an annual citation recognizing outstanding books recently published in the field of music theory.

== Compositions (selected) ==
- Five pieces for small orchestra. New York: Fischer, 1965
- Quartet no. 2, for strings. Philadelphia, Elkan-Vogel, 1967
- No man is an island: for mixed chorus (S.A.T.B.) and piano. New York: Southern Music; Hamburg: Peer Musikverlag, 1968
- Threnody: for violin alone. New York: Southern Music, 1968
- Canto lirico: viola and piano. New York: Carl Fischer, 1970
- Trio, piano, violin, and cello. New York, N.Y.: Carl Fischer, 1977
- Fantasy on Vom Himmel hoch: organ solo. New York: Carl Fischer, 1978
- Variations on a "Martyrs' tune": organ solo. New York: Carl Fischer, 1978
- Anachronisms: violin and piano. New York: Carl Fischer, 1984

== Publications (selected) ==
=== Books ===
- Form in Music (Prentice-Hall, 1966; 2d edition 1986).
- Eighteenth-century Imitative Counterpoint: Music for Analysis, co-authored with Edward Chudacoff (Appleton-Century-Crofts, 1969).
- Structural Functions in Music (Prentice-Hall, 1976; reissued by Dover, 1987).
- Musical Structure and Performance (Yale University Press, 1989).

=== Articles ===
- "The Music of Halsey Stevens," The Musical Quarterly 54/3 (1968): 287-308.
- "On Structural Levels in Music," Music Theory Spectrum 2 (1980): 19-45.
- "Text and Music in the Alto Rhapsody," Journal of Music Theory, 27/2 (1983): 239-253.
- "Metric and Rhythmic Articulation in Music," Music Theory Spectrum 7 (1985): 7-33.
