= Galant Schemata =

Stock phrases in 18th century musical style

Galant Schemata, as described by Robert Gjerdingen in Music in the Galant Style, are "stock musical phrases" in Galant music. The concept of a musical schema is based on schema theory in psychology. Each schema has discernible internal characteristics—such as voice leading, number of events, and relative metric strength and weakness of such events—as well as normative placements in the musical structure as a whole. According to Gjerdingen, the usage of these schemata in a conventional, seamless sequence is "a hallmark of the galant style" and a consequence of the partimento pedagogical tradition of Neapolitan conservatories. Galant schemata, broadly speaking, can be distinguished among opening, closing, cadential, pre-cadential, and post-cadential varieties.

== Opening Schemata ==
=== Romanesca ===
The Romanesca originated from the 16th and 17th centuries as a common musical backdrop in a minor key for singing poetry as well as the basis for variations over a repeating harmonic progression. The later Romanesca is a similar progression and features three variants: the leaping variant, the stepwise variant, and the galant variant, a hybrid of the previous two. Gjerdingen describes the Romanesca as an "opening gambit," meaning that the normative placement of the Romanesca would conventionally be found at the beginning of phrasal structure. A Romanesca melody usually features emphases on scale degrees 1 and 5.

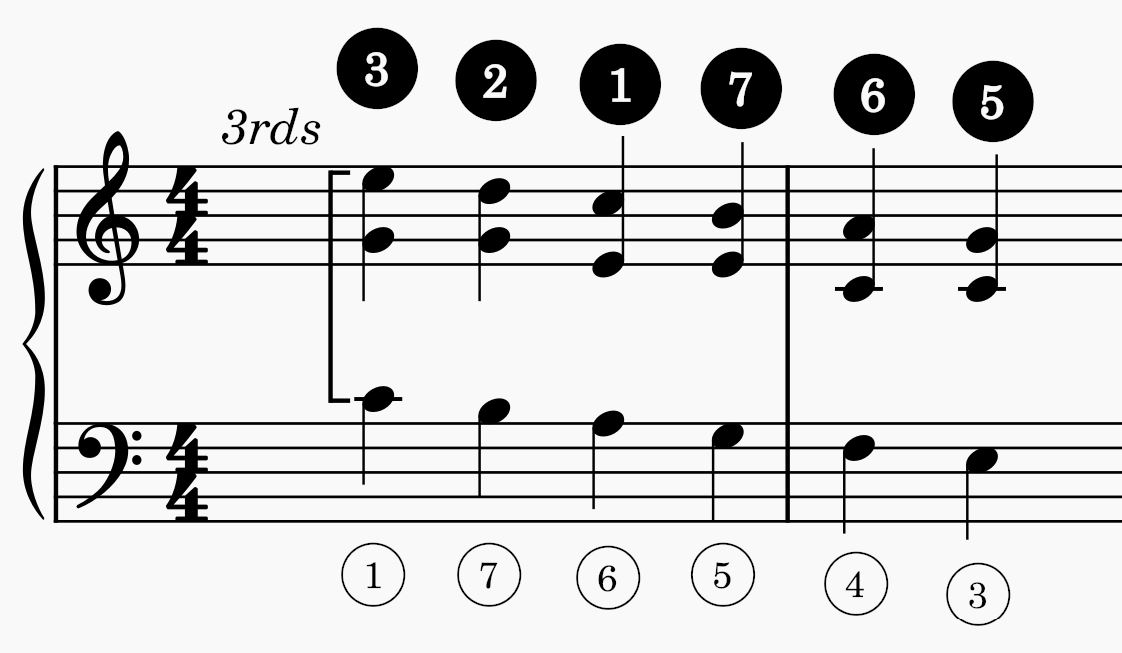
Stepwise variant of the Romanesca.

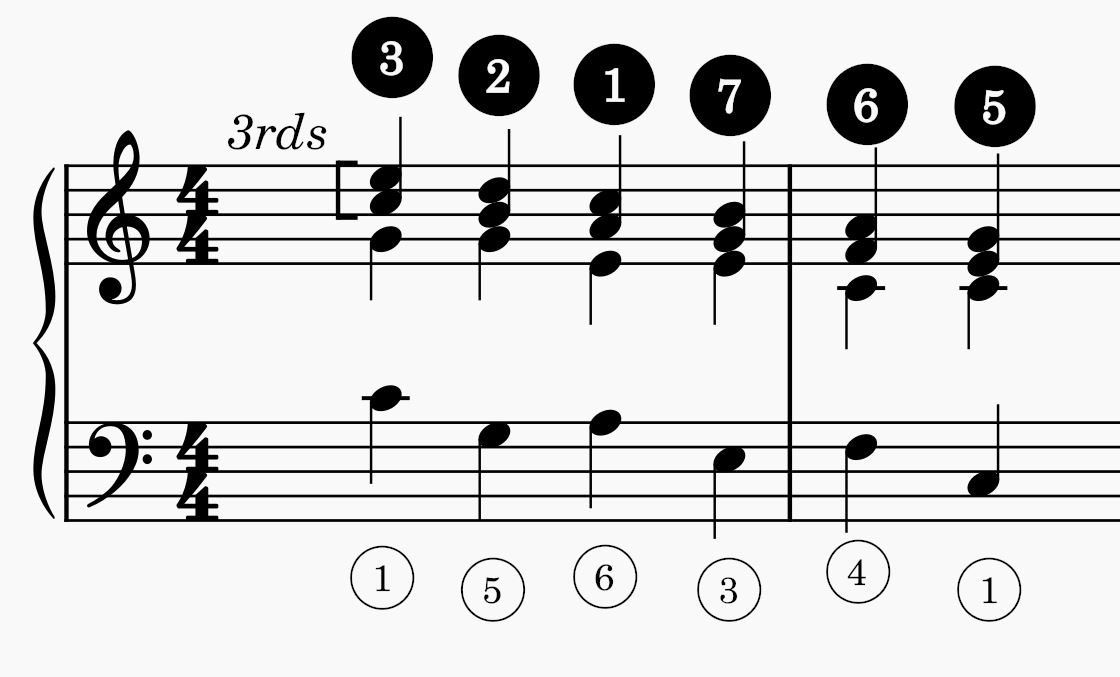
Prototype of a leaping Romanesca.

=== Meyer, Jupiter, Pastorella, and Aprile ===
The Meyer was a popular choice among composers for themes of structural importance in a piece of music. The Meyer features four events presented in pairs of two. The melody features a first descent from scale degree 1 to scale degree 7 in the first pair of events, and then a second descent from scale degree 4 to scale degree 3 in the second pair. The bassline features a stepwise ascent from scale degree 1 to scale degree 2 in the first pair and another stepwise ascent from scale degree 7 to scale degree 1 in the second pair of events. This establishes a tonic function to dominant function "opening" of the harmonic progression in the first pair of events, and then a dominant function to tonic function "closing" of the phrase in the second pair. The Meyer has three related schemas: the Jupiter, the Pastorella, and the Aprile, with their differences being in their melodies. The Jupiter, named after Mozart's Symphony No. 41, features a melody with scale degree 1 to scale degree 2 in the opening pair of events and scale degree 4 to scale degree 3 in the closing. The Pastorella melody features scale degree 3 to scale degree 2 in the opening and scale degree 4 to scale degree 3 in the closing. Lastly, the Aprile melody features scale degree 1 to scale degree 7 in the opening and scale degree 2 to scale degree 1 in the closing. The bassline and harmonic function for the Meyer, Jupiter, Pastorella, and Aprile, however, are similar in that they establish tonic function going to dominant function in the opening and dominant function going to tonic function in the closing.

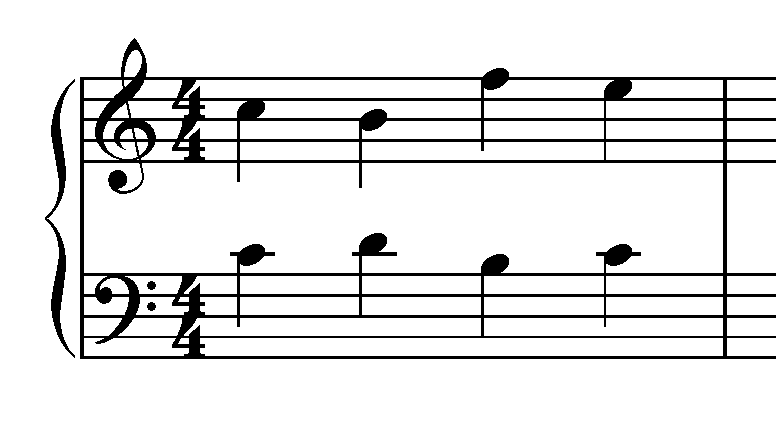
Prototype of the Meyer.

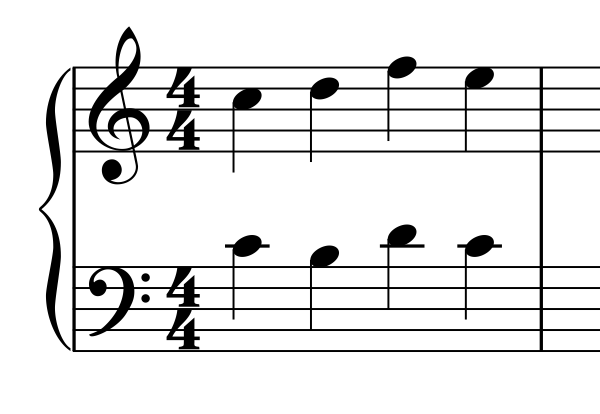
Prototype of the Jupiter.

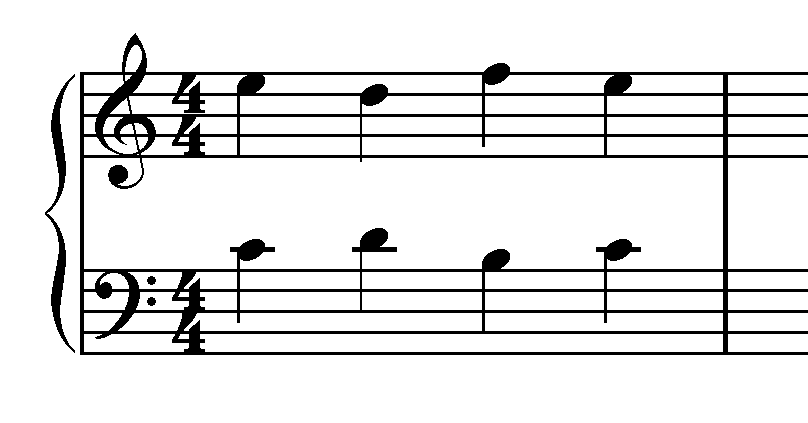
Prototype of the Pastorella.

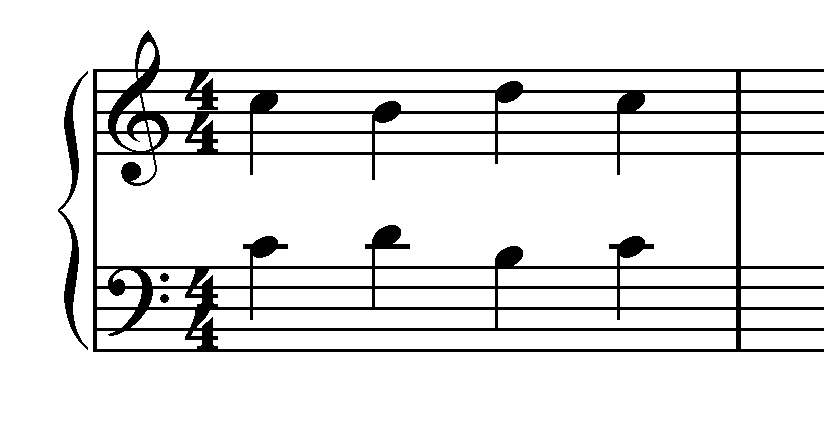
Prototype of the Aprile.

=== Do-Re-Mi ===
The Do-Re-Mi is another common "opening gambit." This schema features three events. Like the name suggests, a Do-Re-Mi melody features stepwise ascent from scale degree 1 to scale degree 3. In the bass, scale degree 1 to scale degree 7 to scale degree 1 is common, as well as scale degree 1 to scale degree 5 to scale degree 1. These three events imply a tonic function in the first event, a dominant function in the second event, and a tonic function again in the third event. A variant called the Adeste Fidelis variant features leaps down to scale degree 5 in the melody.

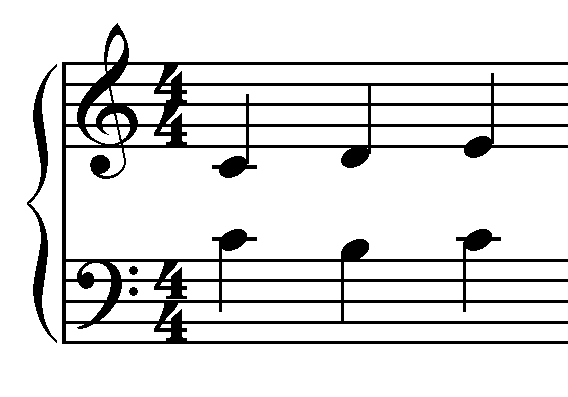
Prototype of the Do-Re-Mi.

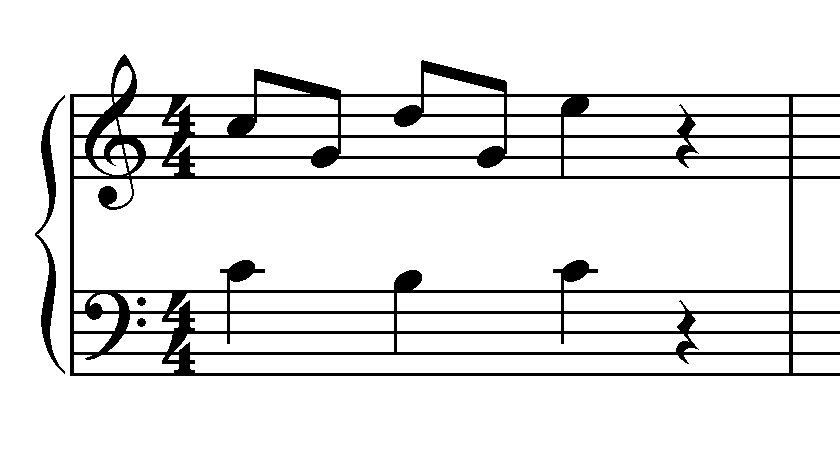
The Adeste Fidelis Variant of the Do-Re-Mi.

=== Sol-Fa-Mi ===
The Sol-Fa-Mi is another opening gambit. Perceived as less bold than a Do-Re-Mi or a Meyer, The Sol-Fa-Mi was typically used for slow movement themes or secondary material in faster, more complex movements. The Sol-Fa-Mi is presented as a pair of dyads. The first and second events feature a melody that steps down from scale degree 5 to 4 and a bass that steps up from scale degree 1 to 2. The third and fourth events feature the melody continuing to step down, this time from scale degree 4 to 3, while the bass steps up from scale degree 7 to 1.

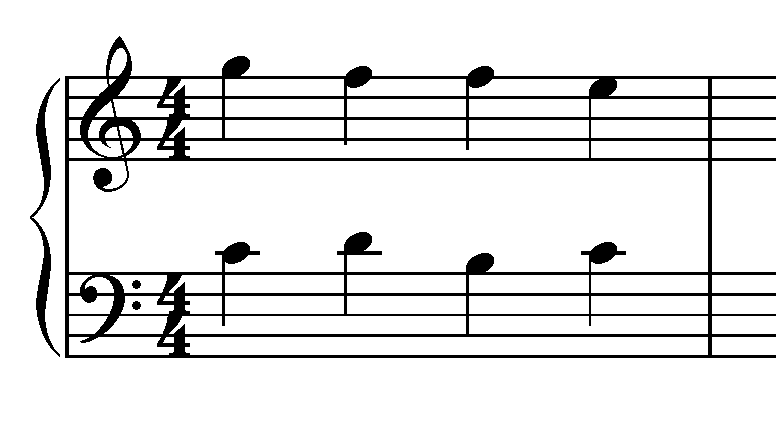
Prototype of the Sol-Fa-Mi.

== Closing Schemata ==
=== Prinner ===
Gjerdingen describes the Prinner as a "riposte" to an opening schema. A Prinner melody features some form of stepwise descent from scale degree 6 to scale degree 3, and the bassline features stepwise descent from scale degree 4 to scale degree 1. A variant of this schema exists with an optional extension in the third event with scale degree 5 in the bass to strengthen the finality of the musical phrase.

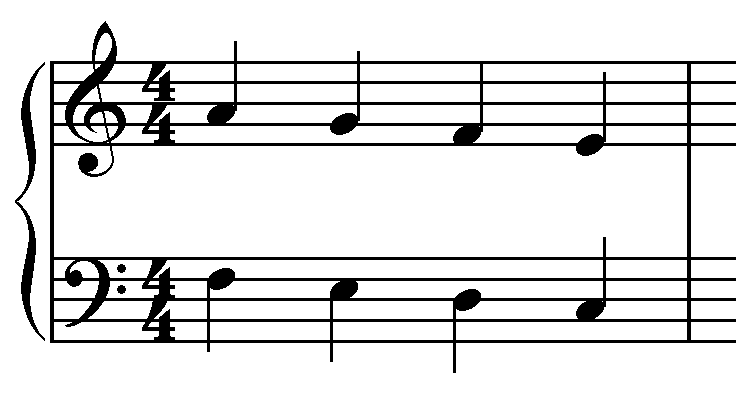
Prototype of the Prinner.

==== Modulating Prinners ====
Composers in the galant period also favored the Prinner as a useful way to modulate from a key to its dominant. Prinners used in this manner are distinguished as modulating Prinners.

=== Fonte ===
The Fonte features four events in two groups of two, or "dyads". The first group is a pair of harmonies in a minor key, and the second group is in a major key. Composers used the Fonte to briefly deviate from the main key of a piece, essentially tonicizing the supertonic of the main key in the first group of events and following it with cadential action in the main key in the second group. The Fonte melody typically features two recognizable sets, corresponding to the two groups of events. The second melodic set in a Fonte is a step lower than the first set. A concept related to the Fonte is the descending fifth sequence.

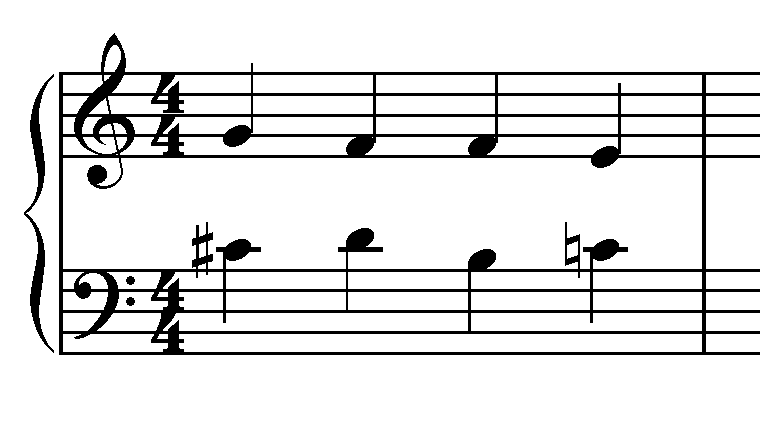
A Fonte prototype.

=== Monte ===
The Monte, like the Fonte, also features events grouped by two. However, unlike the Fonte, it is not uncommon to find early Montes with more than two sections. Later Montes featured mostly featured two sections, the first of which would contain two harmonic events centering around the subdominant of the main key, and the second of which would also contain two events centering the dominant, usually to make up a cadence. The Monte melody features two sections. Typically, the second section is a near copy of the first, but a step higher. The Monte bassline also usually features a melodic ascent. A similar concept to the Monte is the ascending tenths sequence.

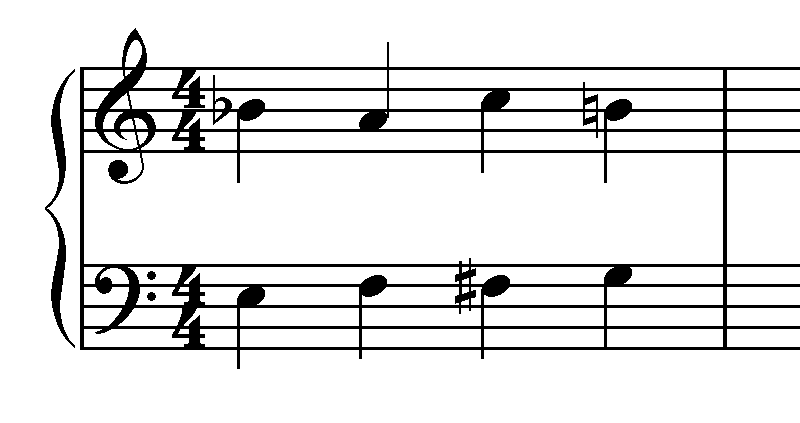
A Monte prototype.

=== Ponte ===
The Ponte acts as a prolongation of a dominant sonority. A Ponte melody typically emphasizes tones of the dominant or dominant seventh harmony, and the bass features repetitions of the fifth scale degree, if not an outright pedal.

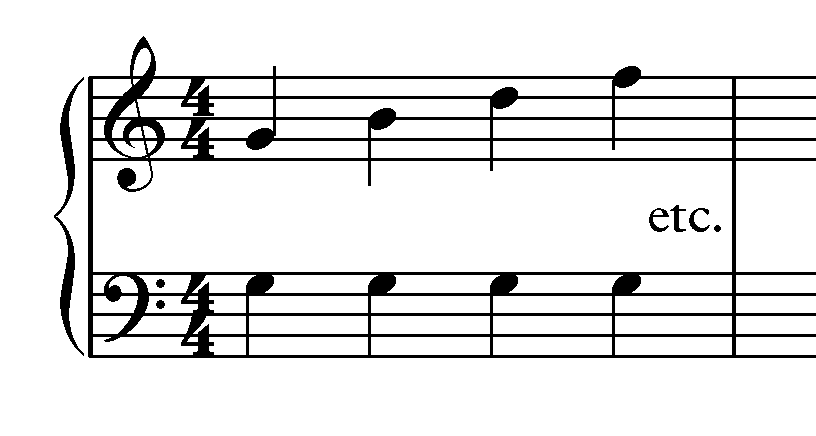

== Cadences ==
Cadential schemata include the Cadenza Semplice (or simple cadence), Cadenza Composta (or compound cadence), and Cadenza Doppia (or double cadence).

== Pre-Cadences ==
=== Fenaroli ===
The Fenaroli features four events, with the melody featuring a descent from scale degree 4 to scale degree 3 followed by an ascent from scale degree 7 to scale degree 1. The Fenaroli bass features a stepwise ascent from scale degrees 7 to 3. Another common Fenaroli melody is scale degree 2 to scale degree 3, then scale degree 7 to scale degree 1, which creates a canon with the bass. A countermelody exists for the Fenaroli, as taught by Francesco Durante.

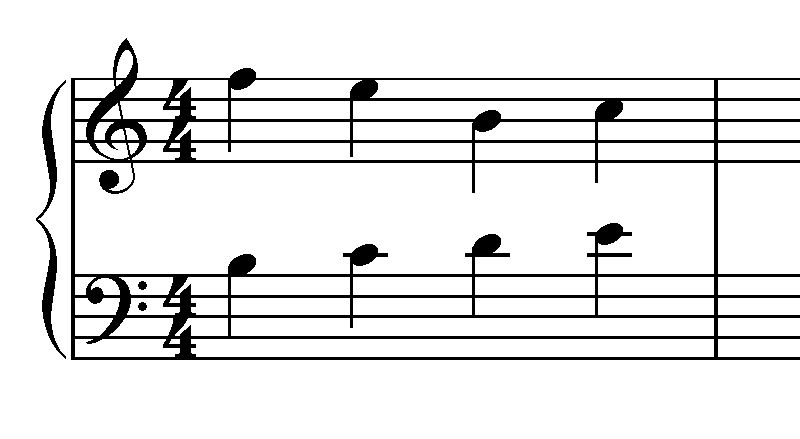
Prototype of the Fenaroli.

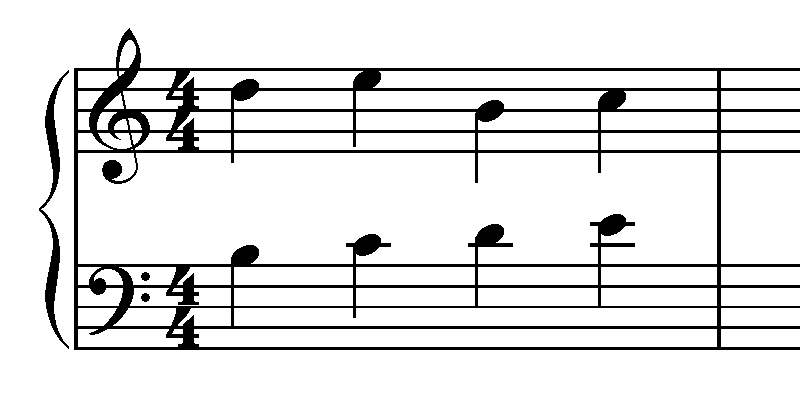
Fenaroli prototype where the melody creates a canon with the bass.

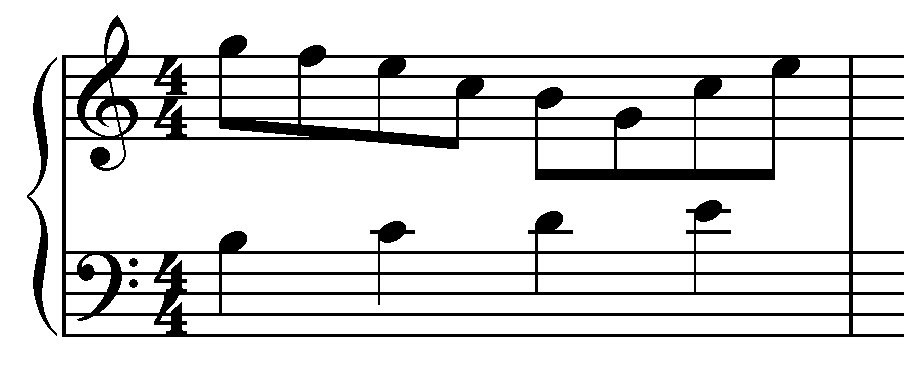
Fenaroli prototype with the Durante countemelody.

=== Indugio ===
As the Ponte serves to prolong a dominant sonority, the Indugio is a prolongation of a predominant sonority before a half cadence. In an Indugio, the melody will often highlight scale degrees 2, 4, and 6, while the bass will emphasize scale degree 4, preparing to go to scale degree 5 for the half cadence.

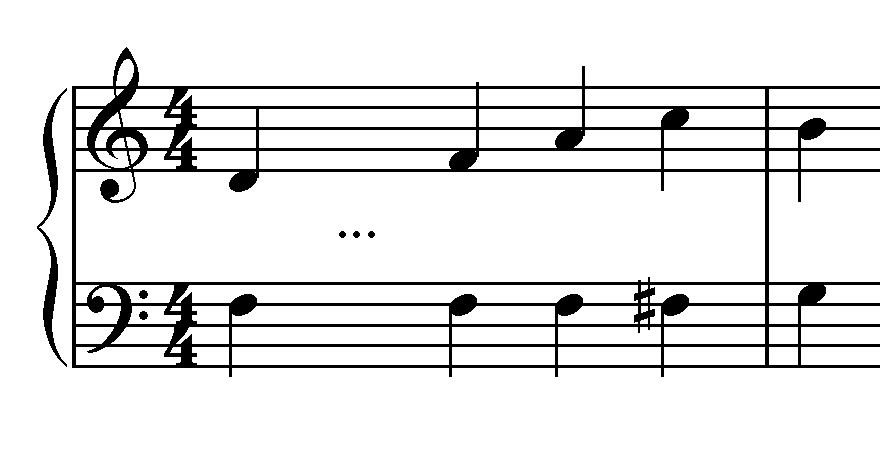
Prototype of the Indugio with half cadence

=== Other Pre-cadences ===
Other pre-cadential schemata include the deceptive cadence, the evaded cadence, the converging cadence, Passo Indietro, and the comma.

== Post-Cadences ==
=== Quiescenza ===
The Quiescenza was used by composers to prolong the tonic following a significant section-ending cadence. As the Quiescenza's function is to rest the music on a tonic harmony, it was also often used in the beginning of pieces to strongly establish the key center. The Quiescenza features four events, with the melody first descending from flat scale degree 7 to scale degree 6, and then ascending from scale degree 7 to scale degree 1. The Quiescenza bass rests on a tonic pedal for its full duration.

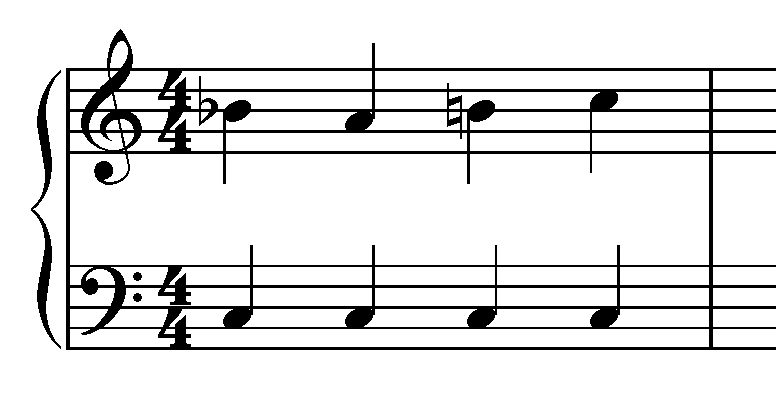
Prototype of the Quiescenza.

== Superimposition of schemata ==
Schemata can be employed serially, but can also be superimposed upon one another. Highly contrapuntal works like fugues often feature overlapping schemata.

== Table of schemata ==
Schema	Melody	Bass	Metric polarity	Variety
The Romanesca	1-5-1-1	1-7-6-3	Strong-weak	Opening
The Prinner	6-5-4-(2)-3	4-3-2-(5)-1	Strong-weak	Closing
Modulating Prinner	3-2-1-7	8-7-6-5	Strong-weak	Closing
The Fonte	4-3, then 4-3 one step lower	7-1, then 7-1 one step lower	Weak-strong	Closing
The Do-Re-Mi	1-2-3	1-7-1	Strong-weak	Opening
The Monte	5-4-3, then 5-4-3 one step higher	7-1 then 7-1 one step higher	Weak-strong	Closing
The Meyer	Open: 1-7 Closed: 4-3	Open: 1-2 Closed:7-1	Weak-strong	Opening
The Quiescenza	b7-6-7-1	1-1-1-1	Weak-strong	Post-cadential
The Ponte	5-7-2	5-5-5	Strong-weak	Closing
The Fenaroli	4-3-7-1	7-1-2-3	Weak-strong	Pre-cadential
The Sol-Fa-Mi	Open: 5-4 Closed: 4-3	Open: 1-2 Closed: 7-1	Weak-strong	Opening
The Indugio	2...4-6-1-7	4...4-4-4#-5	Strong-weak	Pre-cadential
Cadenza Semplice	1-2-2-1	3-4-5-1	Weak-strong	Cadence
Cadenza Composta	1-2-3-2-1	3-4-5-5-1	Weak-strong	Cadence
Cadenza Doppia	4-3-2-1	5-1	Strong-weak	Cadence

== See also ==
- Rule of the Octave
