= Family of musical instruments =

Grouping of different but related types of instruments

A family of musical instruments is a grouping of several different but related sizes or types of instruments. Some schemes of musical instrument classification, such as the Hornbostel-Sachs system, are based on a hierarchy of instrument families and families of families. Orchestral instruments are classified as families based on their commonalities.

Some commonly recognized families are:

- Strings family
- Woodwind family
- Brass family
- Percussion family
- Electronic family
- Keyboard family (which can overlap with one or more of the above families except brass)

Some less common families are:

- Idiophone family
- Plasmaphone family
- Hydraulophone family
- Free Reed subfamily (woodwind)
- Aeolian Instrument family

The keyboard family can also be referenced, though it is not an authentic instrument family. Rather, it is a common design format for instrument interfaces. There are many types of instruments in the keyboard family, such as string, brass (and other metals), woodwind, percussion, electronic, digital, idiophone, and more.

Instruments can also be classified by audio generation method. There are chordophones (generate sound with vibrating strings), membranophones (generate sound with vibrating membranes), idiophones (generate sound by vibrating the instrument body), aerophones (generate sound by vibrating air directly), electrophones (generate sound by modifying circuits or calculating sounds and outputting to a speaker, or potentially arcing electricity or vibrating metal with an electromagnet), plasmaphones (generate sound by exciting air with plasma), and hydraulophones (generate sound by vibrating air with hydraulics). These are typically not used by everyday people or musicians, however.

Family relationships are not always clear-cut. For example, some authorities regard families as encompassing only instruments of different pitch range that have similar construction and tone quality. They therefore, for example, do not regard the cor anglais as a member of the oboe family, because its narrow bore and piriform bell give it a distinctly different tone quality from the oboe.
