= Post-tonal music theory =

Music unstructured from harmonic patterns

Post-tonal music theory is the set of theories put forward to describe music written outside of, or 'after', the tonal system of the common practice period. It revolves around the idea of 'emancipating dissonance', that is, freeing the structure of music from the familiar harmonic patterns that are derived from natural overtones. As music becomes more complex, dissonance becomes indistinguishable from consonance.

== Overview ==
In the latter part of the 19th century, composers began to move away from the tonal system. This is typified in Richard Wagner's music, especially Tristan und Isolde (the Tristan chord, for example). Arnold Schoenberg and his pupil Anton Webern proposed a theory on the emancipation of the dissonance to help analyse the general trend and, in particular, their own atonal music. Composers such as Charles Ives, Dane Rudhyar, and even Duke Ellington and Lou Harrison, connected the emancipation of the dissonance with the emancipation of society and humanity.

The basic idea is that as time progresses, the ear becomes acclimatised to more and more complex sounds. This happens not just for individuals but also for societies as they start to write more complex music. Consonance and dissonance become indistinct from each other: dissonances slowly become heard as consonances. Jim Samson explained it this way: "As the ear becomes acclimatized to a sonority within a particular context, the sonority will gradually become 'emancipated' from that context and seek a new one. The emancipation of the dominant-quality dissonances has followed this pattern, with the dominant seventh developing in status from a contrapuntal note in the sixteenth century to a quasi-consonant harmonic note in the early nineteenth. By the later nineteenth century the higher numbered dominant-quality dissonances had also achieved harmonic status, with resolution delayed or omitted completely. The greater autonomy of the dominant-quality dissonance contributed significantly to the weakening of traditional tonal function within a purely diatonic context."

== Theory ==
Music written within the tonal system is generally analysed by defining a certain note as the primary or tonic note and the derived triad is the tonic chord. Other notes and chords are subservient to the tonic and in a strict hierarchy: the dominant note/chord is second in importance, others are lower down still. One example of this style of analysis is called Schenkerian analysis. However, this form of analysis cannot be applied to atonal music since the very point is to make all the notes and chords equal: there is no hierarchy. Instead, notes/chords can be described in terms of their properties and relationships at any particular moment: whether one note is higher than another, whether one chord has more notes than another, whether one chord is more widely spaced than another, and so on. One can also compare and contrast different strings of notes as transpositions (change in pitch) or inversions (change in note order) of each other. These terms are also used to compare chords. These methods of analysis have been used for centuries but became more important as music began to lose its tonal basis. One also needs to consider other aspects, such as how two or more simultaneous melodies relate to each other (counterpoint) and the same tools are used for this.

In the later 20th century, analysts started to adapt these tools to the yet more complex music being written. Musical set theory was first elaborated for tonal music but was quickly applied to atonal music since it simply provides concepts for categorizing musical objects (notes, chords, melodies and so on) and describing their relationship, without defining any particular note or chord as "primary". The later Transformational theory uses a similar approach but concentrates on the relationships themselves. There are also theories which attempt to relate pitch and rhythm.

== Application ==
Compositional applications of these theories are numerous, but in the present context of post-tonal music the most important is serialism. In this system, certain notes are chosen then written in an order e.g. E–F♯–C–B♭–G–F. (Usually there is no repetition, but this is not always observed.) These notes are then used as the basis for a composition by playing them in the original order, in reverse order (retrograde), in "upside down" order (Inversion i.e. upward intervals now go down, and vice versa), or both (retrograde inversion or "reversion" [Stravinsky's term]), and then transposed up or down. Chords can also be formed out of the series and these can be treated to similar techniques. Schoenberg used these methods in what has become known as twelve-tone technique. In this, all unique twelve notes of the musical scale are played once and once only in a specified order. The serial techniques described above are then applied. Later composers, such as Jean Barraqué and Pierre Boulez, sought to unify pitch and rhythm by organising the elements into sets of twelve, which resulted in what became known as total serialism. See also Formula composition which describes techniques used by Karlheinz Stockhausen.

Aside from serialism, other forms of compositional technique arose such as those based on chords utilizing fourths rather than the more traditional thirds (see quartal and quintal harmony and Synthetic chord), those based on other mathematical processes (see Schillinger System) and those based on specific scales (or "modes": see hexatonic scale, Heptatonic scale, Octatonic scale and Synthetic scale). Olivier Messiaen in his work The Technique of my Musical Language developed what he called modes of limited transposition which displayed a special type of symmetry and which he used in numerous compositions.

== Further developments ==
Microtones and especially quarter tones have been used in music of the 20th and 21st centuries. These are the intervals between semitones. A full theory governing these has yet to be developed but the articles relating to these contain some of the most recent thoughts. (See 15 equal temperament, 19 equal temperament, 24 equal temperament, 34 equal temperament and 72 equal temperament.)

== Examples ==
Transposition:

- The notes A–B–C–D can be transposed downwards to A♭–B♭–C♭–D♭ (the ♭, called a flat, lowers the pitch by one semitone) or upwards to D–E–F–G (the note D is a perfect fourth higher than the note A, E the same amount higher than B and so on).
- The chord C–E–G can be transposed upwards to C♯–E♯–G♯ (the ♯, called a sharp, raises the pitch by one semitone).

Inversion:

- The notes D–F–E–B can be reversed to B–E–F–D; this form of inversion is called retrograde.
- The upward intervals can become downward intervals and vice versa; this is the form that is properly called inversion.
- These two can be combined and the result can be transposed: these are inclusive rather than exclusive processes.

When viewing the following musical examples, it may help to imagine a mirror being placed between the various versions:

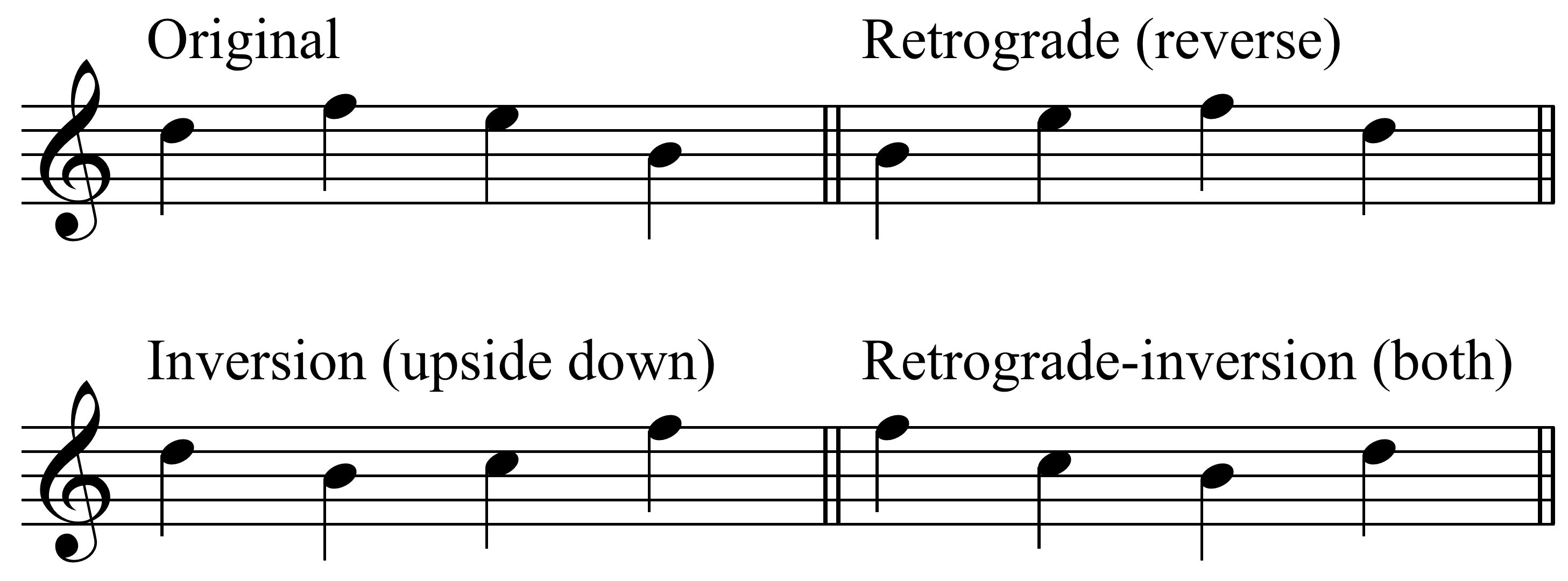
How Retrograde and Inversion work

- The chord C–E–G can be inverted to E–G–C or G–C–E; this is called the inversion of a chord.
- Two lines ("parts") of music can be "inverted" so that the original lower one is made to sound above the original higher one; this is inversion of counterpoint and can be applied to any number of parts.
