= Nikolai Roslavets =

Russian composer

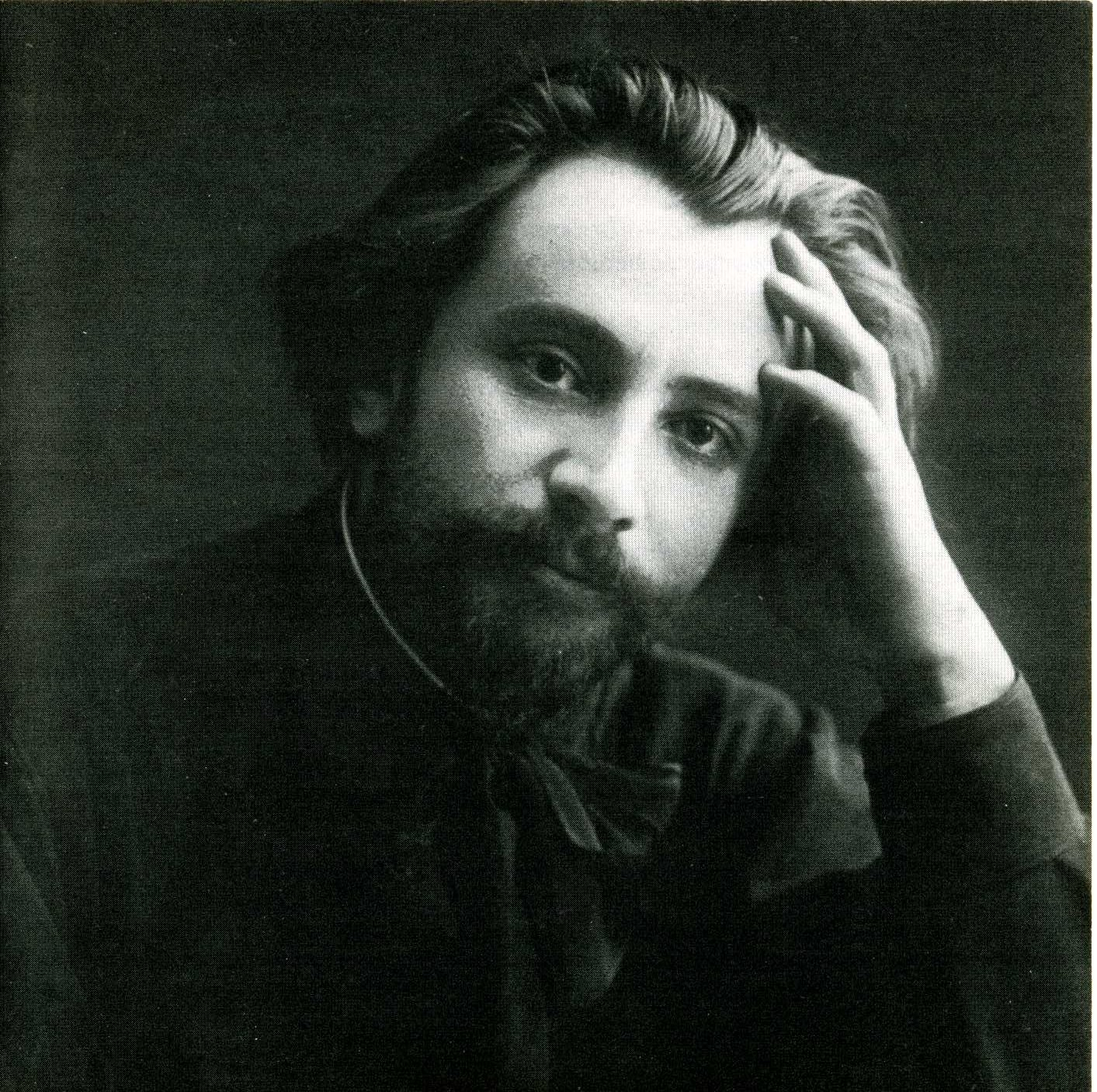
Nikolai Roslavets

Nikolai Andreevich Roslavets (Note: Russian: Николай Андреевич Рославец, romanized: Nikolay Andreyevich Roslavets) (4 January 1881 [O.S. 23 December 1880] – 23 August 1944, also Mykola Andriiovych Roslavets) (Note: Ukrainian: Микола Андрійович Рославець, romanized: Mykola Andriiovych Roslavets) was a modernist composer active in the Russian Empire and later the Soviet Union. Roslavets was a convinced modernist and cosmopolitan thinker; his music was officially suppressed from 1930 onwards.

Among his works are five symphonic poems (three of them are lost), two violin concertos, five string quartets, two viola sonatas, two cello sonatas, six violin sonatas, and five piano trios.

== Life ==
Roslavets was born in Surazh, Chernigov Governorate, Russian Empire. There are three autobiographies by Roslavets that differ considerably from one another. In one of them, published 1924, the composer deliberately misrepresented his biography in order to prevent the attacks by the "Proletarian Musician" faction. There are differing accounts of Roslavets' birthplace, some indicating that he was born in Dushatyn to a peasant family, while he actually was born in 1881 into the family of a railway clerk (of Ukrainian origin, according to Detlef Gojowy) posted in Konotop and Kursk, where Roslavets began to study violin, piano, music theory and harmony under Arkady Abaza. In 1902 Roslavets was accepted as a student at the Moscow Conservatory where he studied violin under Jan Hřímalý, free composition under Sergei Vasilenko, and counterpoint, fugue and musical form under Mikhail Ippolitov-Ivanov and Alexander Ilyinsky. He graduated in 1912 with a silver medal for his cantata Heaven and Earth after Byron's verse drama.

=== Futurism ===
In the 1910s Roslavets' compositions were published in Russian Futurist journals, and futurist artists designed some covers for his music. After 1917 the composer became one of the most prominent public figures of "leftist art" in Russia, together with Arthur Lourié, Kazimir Malevich, Vsevolod Meyerhold and others. Roslavets taught violin and composition in Elets, Kharkiv (then known as Kharkov, where he was director of the Musical Institute) and Moscow. He had a position in the State Publishing House, edited the journal Muzykalnaya Kultura and was one of the leaders of the Association for Contemporary Music.

=== Musicology ===
As a musicologist, Roslavets fought for professionalism, the best in Russian, Western classical and New Music; criticizing vulgar identifications of music with ideology (exemplified in his article ‘On pseudo-proletarian music’). He wrote the first Russian article about Arnold Schoenberg's Pierrot Lunaire. This led to him being harshly attacked in the 1920s by the "proletarian musician" movement, especially by the representatives of the "RAPM," Russian Association of Proletarian Musicians and Prokoll (Production Collective of the Students at the Moscow Conservatory). Roslavets was accused of being a "counter-revolutionary" and "bourgeois" artist, "alien to the proletariat", as well as "formalist", a "class enemy" and in the late 1920s and early 1930s, a "Trotskyist", "saboteur"; etc.

=== Political persecutions ===
In 1928 Roslavets' cantata October was played in the concert in Moscow celebrating the 10th anniversary of the Revolution. In 1930 Roslavets was accused of being a "protector" of the Association of the Moscow Authors, which according to the group "Proletarian Musician" was promoting "light music" and "spreading of the counter-revolutionary literature". The "Roslavets case" was led by Viktor Bely, Alexandr Davidenko, V. Klemens, Yuri Keldysh, Semion Korev, Zara Levina, Georgi Polyanovsky, Alexey Sergeev and Boris Shekhter. It resulted in a professional prohibition of employment. In 1930 Roslavets was banned from obtaining a position as a political editor for two years. In order to save his life, Roslavets had to publicly repent for his former "political mistakes".

During 1932–33 he worked at the Musical Theater in Tashkent, now the capital of Uzbekistan. In 1933 the composer returned to Moscow, where he earned a meager living by teaching and taking occasional jobs. A victim of the political purges, Roslavets could get no official position for the remainder of his life. Roslavets was not admitted to the Composers' Union, instead becoming a member of the Musical Fund. Punitive measures against him had been planned in 1938, and the former "proletarian musicians" had already spread disinformation about him; however Roslavets suffered a severe stroke in 1939 and was a disabled until his death following a second stroke in 1944. His last publication, a song, appeared in 1942.

He is buried in Vagan'kov cemetery in Moscow and the authorities have now granted permission to mark his grave.

== Style ==
While still a student, Roslavets had been engaged in vigorous artistic debates provoked by Russian Futurism, and was close to artists such as Kasimir Malevich, Aristarkh Lentulov, Vasily Kamensky, David Burlyuk and others. Deeply influenced by the later works of Alexander Scriabin and his mystic chord, Roslavets' quest for a personal language began not later than in 1907; it led to him propounding a "new system of sound organisation" based on "synthetic chords" that contain both the horizontal and vertical sound-material for a work (a concept close to that of Schoenberg's twelve-tone serialism). Following an article of Vyacheslav Karatygin, published in February 1915, Roslavets was sometimes referred to as "the Russian Schoenberg," but in 1914 Nikolay Myaskovsky had already stressed the original nature of Roslavets' style. In an article published in 1925 the critic Yevgeni Braudo pointed out that this was no more helpful than calling Schoenberg "the German Debussy." Although in the 1920s Roslavets criticized Scriabin because of his "oversimplification", the "new system of sound organisation" was first of all inspired by Scriabin's ideas and concepts as these were transmitted by Leonid Sabaneyev, a close friend of both Scriabin and Roslavets.

Though the "new system of sound organisation" regulates the whole twelve-tone chromatic scale, most of Roslavets’ "synthetic chords" consist of six to nine tones. In the 1920s Roslavets developed his system, expanding it to encompass counterpoint, rhythm, and musical form while elaborating new principles of teaching. In Roslavets' earlier romances and chamber instrumental compositions those sets were already elaborated side by side with expanded tonality and free atonality. The mature forms of this "new system of sound organization" are typical for the pieces composed between 1913 and 1917, such as Sad Landscapes (1913), Three Compositions for Voice and Piano (1913), String Quartet No. 1 (1913), Four Compositions for Voice and Piano (1913–14), and the Piano Sonatas Nos. 1 (1914) and 2 (1916, reconstructed by Eduard Babasian), etc.

After the Bolshevik revolution, Roslavets made an important contribution to the "revolutionary propaganda in music" in such compositions as the cantata October (1927) and numerous songs. However, his symphonic poem Komsomoliya (1928), demonstrates an extraordinary mastery, a very complex and highly modern compositional technique, far from the simplification typical for "propaganda works".

In Tashkent, he turned for a while to working with folk material, producing among other works the first Uzbek ballet, Pakhta (Cotton). The works of his last years in Moscow show a simplification of his characteristic language to admit an expanded conception of tonality (for instance in the 24 Preludes for violin and piano), but are still highly professional. Among Roslavets' later compositions, the Chamber symphony (1934–35) demonstrates one of the peaks of his "new system of sound organisation" in its later phase.

== Posthumous reputation ==
After Roslavets's death in Moscow, his apartment was ransacked by a group of former "Proletarian Musicians" who confiscated many manuscripts. Roslavets's widow succeeded in hiding many manuscripts; afterwards she handed them over to TsGALI (Central state archive for literature and art, Moscow; now called RGALI, or Russian state archive for literature and art). Some manuscripts were kept by Roslavets's pupil, P. Teplov; now they are in the State Central Glinka-Museum for Musical Culture.

In 1967 the composer's niece Efrosinya Roslavets undertook the first steps to rehabilitate her uncle. It has been found that the composer never submitted to the politically repressive measures. This important step, that the refusal to play Roslavets's compositions was justified for the reason that Roslavets belonged "to the arrested peoples’ enemies," did not improve the situation; Roslavets's oeuvre was suppressed. In 1967 the employee of the Glinka-Museum, Georgi Kirkor, refused Efrosinya Roslavets access to the museum's materials; Kirkor declared Nikolai Roslavets "to be alien to the people" and accused the composer of "relations with the world of Zionism". This dangerous accusation was caused by the fact that Leonid Sabaneyev, a close friend of Roslavets, had promoted Jewish music; the ASM had also promoted Jewish composers.

For thirty years, Roslavets's name, expunged from the musical dictionaries, was hardly mentioned in Soviet musical literature. His name reappeared in a Soviet musical dictionary in 1978 in a negative context. Typical of the highly negative official attitude towards Roslavets were sentences like those: "Roslavets is our enemy," "he is a composer whose music is not worth the paper on which it is written down," "Roslavets's tomb should be destroyed."

In the West, the German musicologist Detlef Gojowy (1934–2008) had been promoting Roslavets. For his activities Gojowy was constantly ideologically attacked on behalf of the officials of the Soviet Composers' Union, in particular personally by Tikhon Khrennikov, and the magazine "Soviet Music." Until 1989, Gojowy was treated as a "militant anti-communist" and a persona non grata. The copies of his articles which the journalist sent to his Soviet colleagues were confiscated by the Soviet customs; Gojowy himself was not allowed to get a Soviet visa.

=== Revival ===
On December, 27th 1980 a concert took place at Mark Milman's club for Chamber music; a section of this concert was devoted to Roslavets's music. According to Edison Denisov, the leaders of the Composers' Union of the Soviet Union banned a concert entirely devoted to the composer. After the first publication about Roslavets's original theoretical concept, based on archival materials (Lobanova 1983) had appeared, M. Lobanova's lecture on Roslavets's musical-theoretical system, declared in the program of the international conference "Musica nel nostro tempo" (Milan) was forbidden in 1984: leading functionaries of the Composers' Union of the Soviet Union had accused the researcher of "illegal contacts to the West." After that, dismissal by Lobanova from the Moscow conservatory was attempted as well as deprivation of her scientific degree and rights for teaching; soon, they tried to use an application of retaliatory psychiatry with the dissident diagnosis against Lobanova.

In 1989 Efrosinja Roslavets requested the Moscow composer organisation, that had just proclaimed itself to be independent from Tikhon Khrennikov's Composers' Union of the Soviet Union, to reconstruct and publish Roslavets's works and to restore Roslavets's grave. In 1990, with the assistance of the head of the Moscow composer organisation, Georgi Dmitriev, Roslavets's grave was identified and restored. Later Roslavets's grave was destroyed again, and all protests remain until now unsuccessful.

== Works (selected list) ==
Stage

- "Pakhta" (Cotton), ballet-pantomime (1931–32)

Vocal

- Heaven and Earth — mystery after Byron (1912)
- On the Earth’s Death — symphonic poem after Jules Laforgue (before 1919) – baritone, chorus and orchestra; lost
- October, cantata after Vasily Alexandrovsky, Vladimir, Kirillov, Sergey Obradovich — mezzo-soprano, mixed chorus and orchestra (1927)
- Komsomoliya, symphonic poem — mixed chorus and orchestra (1928) — ed. by Marina Lobanova; Schott ED 8256
- Black Town, symphonic poem after Alexandre Zharov — bass, chorus and orchestra (1929?), lost
- To Mayakovsky’s Death (14. IV. 1930) after Pimen Panchenko — bass and orchestra (1930)

For voice and piano

- 3 Volumes ed. by Marina Lobanova by Schott Music International: Schott ED 8435, 8436, 8437

Orchestral

- Symphony in C minor (1910) — ed. by Marina Lobanova; Kompositor International 51585
- In the Hours of the New Moon, symphonic poem presumably after Jules Laforgue (approx. 1912–13) — reconstructed and ed. by Marina Lobanova; Schott ED 8107
- The Man and the Sea — symphonic poem after Baudelaire (1921), lost
- Violin Concerto No. 1 (1925) — Schott ED 7823 (score) (copublication with Sov. Kompozitor, 1990); violin and piano arrangement made by the composer published in 1927 by Muzykal'nyi Sektor Gosudarstvennovo izd-va (engraved) (a manuscript violin and piano reduction is now issued by Schott.)
- Violin Concerto No. 2 (1936) — ed. by Marina Lobanova; Kompositor International 52700

Chamber music

- Chamber symphony for 18 players (1934–35) — ed. by M. Lobanova; Kompositor International 51581
- Nocturne for harp, oboe, 2 violas and cello (1913) — Schott ED 8129
- 5 String Quartets:
  - No. 1 (1913) — published ca.1913 by Grosse
  - No. 2 (lost)
  - No. 3 (1920) — published in 1929
  - No. 4 (1939) (incomplete score)
  - No. 5 (1941) — Schott ED 8128
- 5 Piano Trios:
  - No. 1 (lost)
  - No. 2 (1920) — reconstructed and ed. by M. Lobanova; Schott ED 8059
  - No. 3 (1921) — published 1925.
  - No. 4 (1927) — identified and ed. by M. Lobanova; Schott ED 8036
  - No. 5 (lost)

Violin and piano

- 6 Sonatas:
  - No. 1 (1913)
  - No. 2 (1917) — reconstructed and ed. by M. Lobanova; Schott ED 8043
  - No. 3 (lost)
  - No. 4 (1920) — published in 1926 (see IMSLP); also available as Schott ED 8044
  - No. 5 (1922–23) (lost)
  - No. 6 (1930s) — identified and ed. by M. Lobanova; Schott ED 8431
- Trois poèmes: Poéme douloureux, Poème lyrique, Poème (1909–10) — Schott (in preparation)
- Poème lyrique (1910s) — Schott (in preparation)
- Poème (1915) — Schott ED 8261
- Three Dances (1923) — published 1925
- Seven Pieces in first position (1930s) — Schott VLB 131
- Invention and Nocturne (1935) — Schott (in preparation)
- 24 Preludes (1941–42) — Schott ED 7940

Viola and piano

- Sonata No. 1 (1926) — reconstructed and ed. by M. Lobanova; Schott ED 8177
- Sonata No. 2 (1930s) — ed. by M. Lobanova; Schott ED 8178

Cello and piano

- Dance of the White Girls (1912) — ed. by M. Lobanova; Schott ED 8045
- Meditation (1921)
- Sonata No. 1 (1921) — published 1924
- Sonata No. 2 (1921–1922) — ed. by M. Lobanova; Schott ED 8039

Piano music

- Three Etudes (1914) — published 1914 by Grosse
- Three Compositions (1914) — Schott ED 7907 . First published 1915 (author's edition)
- Two Compositions (1915) — Schott ED 7907 . First published 1915 (author's edition)
- Prelude (1915) — Schott ED 7907
- 6 Piano Sonatas:
  - No. 1 (1914) — Published by Muzyka, 1990 (edited by Eduard Babasyan)
  - No. 2 (1916) — reconstructed by Eduard Babasyan; Schott 8391
  - No. 3 (lost)
  - No. 4 (1923) (lost)
  - No. 5 (1923) — published in 1925
  - No. 6 (1928) (not complete)
- Berceuse (1919) — Schott (in preparation)
- Danse (1919) — Schott (in preparation)
- Valse (1919) — reconstructed by M. Lobanova; Schott (in preparation)
- Prelude (1919 or 1921) — reconstructed by M. Lobanova; Schott (in preparation)
- Four Compositions (1919–1921): Prélude (lost); Poème; Prélude (lost); Prélude — Schott (in preparation)
- Five Preludes (1919–22) — Schott ED 7907
- Two Poems (1920) — published 1928 (Muzgiz, Universal Edition)

== See also ==
- Arthur Lourié
- Alexander Mosolov
- Leonid Sabaneyev

== Sources ==
- Foreman, Lewis. "In Search of a Soviet Pioneer: Nikolai Roslavets", Tempo, New Series, No. 135, (Dec., 1980), pp. 27–29.
- Gojowy D. "N. A. Roslavec, ein früher Zwölftonkomponist". Die Musikforschung 22 (1969), S. 22–38
- Gojowy D. "Sowjetische Avantgardisten". Musik und Bildung 1969, p. 537–42.
- Gojowy D. Neue sowjetische Musik der 20er Jahre. Laaber 1980.
- Lobanova, Marina. "L’eredità die N. A. R. ne campo della teoria musicale". "Musica/Realtà" 12 (1983), p. 41–64
- Gojowy D. "Sinowi Borissowitsch im Keller entdeckt. Sowjetische Musikwissenschaft in der Perestrojka". Das Orchester 39 (1991), H. 11, S. 1224
- Gojowy D. "Wiederentdeckte Vergangenheit. Die russisch-sowjetische Avantgarde der 10er und 20er Jahre rehabilitiert?" In Neue Musik im politischen Wandel. Veröffentlichungen des Darmstädter Instituts für Neue Musik und musikalische Erziehung, vol. 32, pp. 9–22. Mainz 1991.
- Gojowy, D. Musikstunden. Beobachtungen, Verfolgungen und Chroniken neuer Tonkunst. Cologne, 2008.
- Hakobian, Levon. Music of the Soviet Age 1917–1987. Stockholm 1998 ISBN 91-972133-4-9.
- Hust "Chr. Tonalitätskonstruktion in den Klaviersonaten von N. A. Roslavec". Die Musikforschung 54 (2001), pp. 429–37.
- "Internationale Musik-Festivals Heidelberg 1991 und 1992. Russische Avantgarde. Musikavantgarde im Osten Europas. Dokumentation – Kongressbericht ". Heidelberg 1992.
- McKnight "Ch. Nikolaj Roslavets". Diss. Ithaca: Cornell University, 1994.
- Lobanova, Marina. "Nikolaj Roslawez. Biographie eines Künstlers—Legende, Lüge, Wahrheit". In Visionen und Aufbrüche. Zur Krise der modernen Musik 1908–1933, edited by W. Gruhn, et al.. Kassel 1994, pp. 45–62.
- Lobanova, Matina. "Der Fall Nikolaj Roslawez". "Neue Zeitschrift für Musik" 1995, no. 1; pp. 40–43.
- Lobanova M. Nikolaj. "Roslavetz—Ein Schicksal unter der Diktatur". In Verfemte Musik. Komponisten in den Diktaturen unseres Jahrhunderts. Dokumentation des Kolloquiums vom 9.–12. Januar 1993 in Dresden, edited by J. Braun, H. T. Hoffmann, and V. Karbusicky, pp. 159–76. Frankfurt am Main: Peter Lang, 1995. Second edition 1998.
- Lobanova M. Nikolaj Andreevič Roslavec und die Kultur seiner Zeit, with a foreword by György Ligeti. Frankfurt am Main: Peter Lang, 1997.
- Lobanova, Marina. "Das neue System der Tonorganisation von Nikolaj Andreevič Roslavec". Die Musikforschung 54 (2001), pp. 400–28.
- Lobanova, Marina. "Nicolaj Roslavec und sein tragisches Erbe". In Musikgeschichte in Mittel- und Osteuropa, pp. 241–72 . Mitteilungen der internationalen Arbeitsgemeinschaft an der Universität Leipzig 10. Leipzig 2005.
- Lobanova M. Mystiker Magier, Theosoph, Theurg: Alexander Skrjabin und seine Zeit. Hamburg 2004.
- Die Musik in Geschichte und Gegenwart
- Lobanova, Marina. Nikolai Andreyevich Roslavets i kultura ego vremeni. St. Petersburg: Petroglif, 2011. ISBN 978-5-98712-059-0.
- Roslawez, Nikolai. "Pierrot lunaire von Arnold Schönberg. Übersetzung, Einleitung (Roslawez und Schönberg) und Kommentar von Marina Lobanova". Dissonanz 61/1999, pp. 22–27.
- Slonimsky, Nicolas. Music since 1900, fourth edition. N.Y., 1971.
- Wehrmeyer, Andreas. Studien zum russischen Musikdenken um 1920. Frankfurt am Main: Peter Lang, 1991.
