= Tristan chord =

Musical chord

Component intervals from root
- augmented second
- augmented sixth
- augmented fourth (tritone)
- root [F]

Forte no. / Complement
- 4–27 / 8–27

The original Tristan chord is heard in the opening phrase of Richard Wagner's opera Tristan und Isolde as part of the leitmotif relating to Tristan. It is made up of the notes F, B, D♯, and G♯:

More generally, the term refers to any chord that consists of the same intervals: augmented fourth, augmented sixth, and augmented ninth above a bass note.

== Background ==
The notes of the Tristan chord are not unusual; they could be respelled enharmonically to form a common half-diminished seventh chord. What distinguishes the Tristan chord is its unusual relationship to the implied key of its surroundings.

This motif also appears in measures 6, 10, and 12, several times later in the work, and at the end of the last act.

Martin Vogel points out the chord in earlier works by Guillaume de Machaut, Carlo Gesualdo, J. S. Bach, Mozart, Beethoven, or Louis Spohr as in the following example from the first movement of Beethoven's Piano Sonata No. 18:

The chord is found in several works by Chopin, from as early as 1828, in the Sonata in C minor, Op. 4 and his Scherzo No. 1, composed in 1830. It is only in late works where tonal ambiguities similar to Wagner's arise, as in the Prelude in A minor, Op. 28, No. 2, and the posthumously published Mazurka in F minor, Op. 68, No. 4.

The Tristan chord's significance is in its move away from traditional tonal harmony, and even toward atonality. With this chord, Wagner actually provoked the sound or structure of musical harmony to become more predominant than its function, a notion that was soon explored by Debussy and others. In the words of Robert Erickson, "The Tristan chord is, among other things, an identifiable sound, an entity beyond its functional qualities in a tonal organization".

== Analysis ==
Much has been written about the Tristan chord's possible harmonic functions or voice leading and the motif has been interpreted in various ways. Though enharmonically equivalent to the half-diminished seventh chord F^{ø}^{7} (F–A♭–C♭–E♭), the Tristan chord can also be interpreted in many ways. Nattiez distinguishes between functional and nonfunctional analyses of the chord.

=== Functional analyses ===
Functional analyses have interpreted the chord in the key of A minor in many ways:

The Tristan chord analyzed as a French sixth (in red) with appoggiatura and dominant seventh with passing tone in A minor
- The chord is an augmented sixth chord, specifically a French sixth chord, F–B–D♯-A, with the note G♯ heard as an appoggiatura resolving to A. (Theorists debate the root of French sixth chords.) The harmonic function as a predominant is intact, with the chord moving to V^{7}. Note that, in this view, the G♯ resolving upward to A is the 2nd of 3 consecutive accented dissonances resolving by half step. Alfred Lorenz and others interpret it more broadly as an augmented sixth chord F–A–D♯, based after Hugo Riemann on the principle that there are only three chord functions: tonic, predominant, and dominant.
- The root is the second scale degree, B.
- The root is the fourth scale degree, D. Arend interprets it as "a modified minor seventh chord"

F–B–D♯–G♯ → F–C♭–E♭–A♭ → F–B–D–A = D–F–A

- The chord is a secondary dominant, V/V, and thus also with a root on B. This favors the fifth motion from B to E, seeing the chord as a seventh chord with lowered fifth (B–D♯(D♮)–F♯–A). It would therefore act as the supertonic chord in a ii-V imperfect cadence.

Vincent d'Indy analyses the chord as a IV chord after Riemann's transcendent principle (as phrased by Serge Gut: "the most classic succession in the world: Tonic, Predominant, Dominant" ) and rejects the idea of an added "lowered seventh", eliminates "all artificial, dissonant notes, arising solely from the melodic motion of the voices, and therefore foreign to the chord," finding that the Tristan chord is "no more than a predominant in the key of A, collapsed in upon itself melodically, the harmonic progression represented thus:

Célestin Deliège, independently, sees the G♯ as an appoggiatura to A, describing that

in the end only one resolution is acceptable, one that takes the subdominant degree as the root of the chord, which gives us, as far as tonal logic is concerned, the most plausible interpretation ... this interpretation of the chord is confirmed by its subsequent appearances in the Prelude's first period: the IV^{6} chord remains constant; notes foreign to that chord vary.

The Tristan chord as appoggiaturas resolving to a dominant

According to Jacques, discussing Dommel-Diény and Gut, "it is rooted in a simple dominant chord of A minor [E major], which includes two appoggiaturas resolved in the normal way". Thus, in this view it is not a chord but an anticipation of the dominant chord in measure three. Chailley did once write:

Tristan's chromaticism, grounded in appoggiaturas and passing notes, technically and spiritually represents an apogee of tension. I have never been able to understand how the preposterous idea that Tristan could be made the prototype of an atonality grounded in destruction of all tension could possibly have gained credence. This was an idea that was disseminated under the (hardly disinterested) authority of Schoenberg, to the point where Alban Berg could cite the Tristan Chord in the Lyric Suite, as a kind of homage to a precursor of atonality. This curious conception could not have been made except as the consequence of a destruction of normal analytical reflexes leading to an artificial isolation of an aggregate in part made up of foreign notes, and to consider it—an abstraction out of context—as an organic whole. After this, it becomes easy to convince naive readers that such an aggregation escapes classification in terms of harmony textbooks.

Fred Lerdahl presents alternate interpretations of the Tristan motive, as either i ii♯643 [French sixth: F–B–D♯–A] V7 or as VI (iv) (vii♯64♯2) [ altered pre-dominant: F–B–D♯–G♯] V7, both in A minor, concluding that while both interpretations have strong expectation or attraction, that the version with G♯ is the stronger progression.

=== Nonfunctional analyses ===
Nonfunctional analyses are based on structure (rather than function), and are characterized as vertical characterizations or linear analyses.

Vertical characterizations include interpreting the chord's root as on the seventh degree (VII), of F♯ minor.

Linear analyses include that of Noske and Schenker was the first to analyze the motif entirely through melodic concerns. Schenker and later Mitchell compare the Tristan chord to a dissonant contrapuntal gesture from the E minor fugue of The Well-Tempered Clavier, Book I.

William Mitchell, viewing the Tristan chord from a Schenkerian perspective, does not see the G♯ as an appoggiatura because the melodic line (G♯–A–A♯–B) ascends to B, making the A a passing note. This ascent by minor third is mirrored by the descending line (F–E–D♯–D), a descent by minor third, making the D♯, like A♯, an appoggiatura. This makes the chord a diminished seventh chord (G♯–B–D–F).

Serge Gut argues that, "if one focuses essentially on melodic motion, one sees how its dynamic force creates a sense of an appoggiatura each time, that is, at the beginning of each measure, creating a mood both feverish and tense ... thus in the soprano motif, the G♯ and the A♯ are heard as appoggiaturas, as the F and D♯ in the initial motif." The chord is thus a minor chord with an added sixth (D–F–A–B) on the fourth degree (IV), though it is engendered by melodic waves.

Allen Forte first identifies the chord as an atonal set, 4–27 (half-diminished seventh chord), then "elect[s] to place that consideration in a secondary, even tertiary position compared to the most dynamic aspect of the opening music, which is clearly the large-scale ascending motion that develops in the upper voice, in its entirety a linear projection of the Tristan Chord transposed to level three, g♯′–b′–d″–f♯″.

Schoenberg describes it as a "wandering chord [vagierender Akkord]... it can come from anywhere".

=== Mayrberger's opinion ===
After summarizing the above analyses Nattiez asserts that the context of the Tristan chord is A minor, and that analyses which say the key is E major or E♭ minor are "wrong". He privileges analyses of the chord as on the second degree (II). He then supplies a Wagner-approved analysis, that of Czech professor Carl Mayrberger who "places the chord on the second degree, and interprets the G♯ as an appoggiatura. But above all, Mayrberger considers the attraction between the E and the real bass F to be paramount, and calls the Tristan chord a Zwitterakkord (an ambiguous, hybrid, or possibly bisexual or androgynous, chord), whose F is controlled by the key of A minor, and D♯ by the key of E minor".

== Responses and influences ==
Four measures of "Golliwogg's Cakewalk" from Claude Debussy's Children's Corner that quote the opening of the opera

The chord and the figure surrounding it is well enough known to have been parodied and quoted by a number of later musicians. Debussy includes the chord in a setting of the phrase je suis triste in his opera Pelléas et Mélisande. Debussy also jokingly quotes the opening bars of Wagner's opera several times in "Golliwogg's Cakewalk" from his piano suite Children's Corner. Benjamin Britten slyly invokes it at the moment in Albert Herring when Sid and Nancy spike Albert's lemonade and then, when he drinks it, the chord "runs riot through the orchestra and recurs irreverently to accompany his hiccups". Paul Lansky based the harmonic content of his first electronic piece, mild und leise (1973), on the Tristan chord. This piece is best known from being sampled in the Radiohead song "Idioteque".

Bernard Herrmann incorporated the chord in his scores for Vertigo (1958) and Tender is the Night (1962).

Christian Thielemann, the music director of the Bayreuth Festival from 2015–20, discussed the Tristan chord in his book, My Life with Wagner: the chord "is the password, the cipher for all modern music. It is a chord that does not conform to any key, a chord on the verge of dissonance", and "The Tristan chord does not seek to be resolved in the closest consonance, as the classic theory of harmony requires; [it] is sufficient unto itself, just as Tristan and Isolde are sufficient unto themselves and know only their love."

More recently, American composer and humorist Peter Schickele crafted a tango around the Tristan prelude, a chamber work for four bassoons entitled Last Tango in Bayreuth. The Brazilian conductor and composer Flavio Chamis wrote Tristan Blues, a composition based on the Tristan chord. The work, for harmonica and piano, was recorded on the CD Especiaria, released in Brazil by the Biscoito Fino label. New York-based composer Dalit Warshaw's narrative concerto for piano and orchestra, Conjuring Tristan, employs the Tristan chord in exploring the themes of Thomas Mann's novella Tristan through Wagner's music.

The prelude of Wagner's opera is prominently used in the film Melancholia by Lars von Trier.

== See also ==
- Elektra chord
- Mystic chord
- Petrushka chord
- Psalms chord
- Synthetic chord
