= Synthetic music =

Synthetic music may refer to:

- Synthetic chord, a made-up or non-traditional chord
- Music using a synthesizer, an electronic musical instrument that generates audio signals
- Synth-pop, a music genre featuring the synthesizer as the dominant musical instrument
- Music and artificial intelligence

== See also ==
- "Synthetic", a song by Spineshank from The Height of Callousness, 2000
