= Elektra chord =

Polychord

Component intervals from root
- diminished fourth
- minor second
- diminished seventh
- perfect fifth
- root

Forte no. / Complement
- 5-32 / 7-32

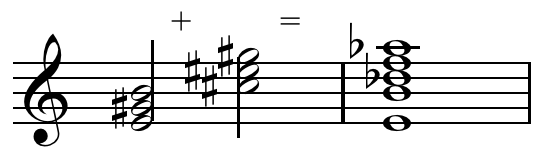
Elektra chord implies an E major and C♯ major chord together (C♯ E♯ G♯ = D♭ F♮ A♭) Each chord separately as arpeggio then both simultaneously

The Elektra chord is a "complexly dissonant signature-chord" and motivic elaboration used by composer Richard Strauss to represent the title character of his opera Elektra that is a "bitonal synthesis of E major and C-sharp major" and may be regarded as a polychord related to conventional chords with added thirds, in this case an eleventh chord. It is enharmonically equivalent to a 7♯9 chord, D♭–F–A♭–C♭–E, and a 6♭9 chord, E–G♯–B-C♯-F.

In the opera, the chord—Elektra's "harmonic signature"—is treated various ways betraying "both tonal and bitonal leanings... a dominant ^{4}_{2} over a nonharmonic bass." It is associated as well with its seven-note complement which may be arranged as a dominant thirteenth while other characters are represented by other motives or chords, such as Klytämnestra's contrasting harmony. The Elektra chord's complement appears at important points and the two chords form a 10-note pitch collection, lacking D and A, which forms one of Elektra's "distinctive 'voices'."

Motivic elaboration of Elektra chord Elektra chord as motive

== Use in other works ==
The chord is also found in Claude Debussy's Feuilles mortes, where it may be analyzed as an appoggiatura to a minor ninth chord, Franz Schreker's Der ferne Klang, and Alexander Scriabin's Sixth Piano Sonata.

== See also ==
- Gamma chord
- Mystic chord
- Petrushka chord
- Psalms chord
- Tristan chord
