= Mystic chord =

Six-note synthetic chord that appears in compositions by Alexander Scriabin

Component intervals from root
- major second
- major sixth
- major third
- minor seventh
- augmented fourth
- root

Forte no.
- 6–34

In music, the mystic chord or Prometheus chord is a six-note synthetic chord and its associated scale, or pitch collection, that loosely serves as the harmonic and melodic basis for some of Russian composer Alexander Scriabin's later pieces. Scriabin did not use the chord directly but rather derived material from its transpositions.

When rooted in C, the mystic chord consists of the pitch classes C, F♯, B♭, E, A, and D.

This is often interpreted as a quartal hexachord consisting of an augmented fourth, diminished fourth, augmented fourth, and two perfect fourths. The chord is related to other pitch collections. For example, it is a hexatonic subset of the overtone scale, also known in jazz circles as the Lydian dominant scale, lacking the perfect fifth.

== Nomenclature ==
The term "mystic chord" appears to derive from Alexander Scriabin's intense interest in Theosophy, and the chord is imagined to reflect this mysticism. It was coined by Arthur Eaglefield Hull in 1916.

It is also known as the "Prometheus chord", after its extensive use in Scriabin's Prometheus: The Poem of Fire. The term was employed by Leonid Sabaneyev.

Igor Bèlza suggested the name "chord of the pleroma", which was wrongly attributed to Scriabin by Richard Taruskin.

== Qualities ==
Jim Samson points out that the chord fits in well with Scriabin's mainly dominant-quality sonorities and harmony, as it may take on a dominant quality on C or F♯. This tritone relationship between possible resolutions is important to Scriabin's harmonic language, and it is a property shared by the French sixth (also prominent in his work) of which the synthetic chord can be seen as an extension. The example below shows the mystic chord rewritten as a French sixth with notes A and D as extensions:

The pitch collection is related to the octatonic scale, the whole tone scale, and the French sixth, all of which are capable of a different number of transpositions. For example, the chord is a whole tone scale with one note raised a semitone (the "almost whole-tone" hexachord, sometimes called "whole tone-plus"), and this alteration allows for a greater variety of resources through transposition.

Leonid Sabaneyev interpreted the Prometheus chord as harmonics 8 through 14 without 12 (1, 9, 5, 11, 13, 7 = C, D, E, F↑, A♭, B♭), but the 11th harmonic is 48.68 cents away from the tritone (F♯), the 13th harmonic is 59.47 cents away from a major sixth (A♮).

Carl Dahlhaus wrote, "the interval-distance of the natural-tone-row [overtones] [...], counting up to 20, includes everything from the octave to the quarter tone, (and) useful and useless musical tones. The natural-tone-row [harmonic series] justifies everything, that means, nothing." Elliott Antokoletz says the "so-called 'mystic chord'" approximates harmonics 7 through 13 (7, 8, 9, 10, (11,) 12, 13 = C, D-, E, F♯, (G↑-,) A, B♭-).

The notes of the chord also conform to a Lydian dominant quality, the fourth mode of the melodic minor scale.

== Use by Scriabin ==
Some sources suggest that much of Scriabin's music is entirely based on the chord to the extent that whole passages are little more than long sequences of this chord, unaltered, at different pitches, but this is uncommon. More often, the notes are reordered so as to supply a variety of harmonic or melodic material. Some of Scriabin's late pieces are based on other synthetic chords or scales that do not rely on the mystic chord.

There seems today to be a general consensus that the mystic chord is neither the key nor the generating element in Scriabin's method.

— Jay Reise (1983)

In his 2023–2024 essay "Scriabin's Compositional Methods: Analysis and Review", Reise updated his position, noting that Scriabin's close colleague and biographer Leonid Sabaneyev wrote that "Scriabin often said his music was based on his 'synthetic harmony.'" Reise has adopted Scriabin's term in place of “mystic chord” (a term Scriabin never used) throughout his essay. Reise further points out (as have others) that in many of the late pieces, Scriabin extends the synthetic harmony by adding the note G - the next ascending P4. Reise posits that this expanded harmony, which contains all the notes of the acoustic scale, might be reasonably called the synthetic harmony+.

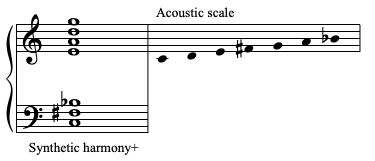

The synthetic harmony(+) is the referential element for the orthography, the procedures governing the voice leading of the whole tone and octatonic scales, the registral distribution of the harmony, and the derivation of the complete octatonic scale. According to Reise, all scales (including the 9-note scale of the Poème Op. 71 No. 1) either resolve or impliy resolution to the octatonic or whole scales.

Matthew Bengtson writes, "the mystic chord acts as a kind of mediator, a convenient means of transit, hovering, as in mid-air, between the whole-tone and octatonic harmonic worlds."

Other sources suggest that Scriabin's method of pitch organization is based on ordered scales that feature scale degrees. Since the mystic chord is a synthetic chord, the scale from which it derives, sometimes called the "Prometheus scale", is an example of a synthetic scale.

For example, a group of piano miniatures (Op. 58, Op. 59/2, Op. 61, Op. 63, Op. 67/1 and Op. 69/1) are governed by the acoustic and/or the octatonic scales.

Contrary to many textbook descriptions of the chord, which present it as a series of superposed fourths, Scriabin most often manipulated the voicings to produce a variety of melodic and harmonic intervals. (Note: In the same manner that a dominant seventh, built on superposed thirds, will deploy intervals of a sixth, fourth, and/or second under inversion.) A rare example of purely quartal spacing can be found in the Fifth Piano Sonata (mm. 264 and 268). Measures 263–264 are shown below.

Incomplete versions of the chord spaced entirely in fourths are considerably more common, for example, in Deux Morceaux, Op. 57.

According to George Perle, Scriabin used this chord in what he calls a pre-serial manner, producing harmonies, chords, and melodies. But Scriabin, like Perle, did not use the chord as an ordered set and did not worry about repeating or omitting notes or aggregate combinatoriality. (Note: "Half a dozen years or so after Scriabin's death, Schoenberg came up with the principle of ordering and Hauer with the principle of partitioning as a means of differentiating representations of the universal set of twelve pitch classes from one another, the foundational requirement for a twelve-tone system. Scriabin's sketches for his projected 'Prefatory Action' show that in the last year of his short life he was already preoccupied with the same problem.") (Note: "Scriabin, in his employment of a...complicated set, of transpositions of the set, of invariant segment that function as pivotal elements among the various transpositions, and of consistent variants of the set, may be considered the first to exploit a set systematically as a means of compensating for the loss of the traditional tonal functions.")

== Use by other composers ==
The mystic chord as a dominant chord (in this case, as V/V) in Duke Ellington's 1958 piano piece "Reflections in D". The E dominant 9th chord has ♯11th and 13th appoggiaturas added, which resolve conventionally.

With the increasing use of more dissonant sonorities, some 20th- and 21st-century composers have used this chord..

In jazz music, such chords are extremely common, and in this setting the mystic chord can be viewed simply as a C^{13♯11} chord with the fifth omitted. In the score to the right is an example of a Duke Ellington composition that uses a different voicing of this chord at the end of the second bar, played on E (E^{13♯11}).

== See also ==
- Elektra chord
- Petrushka chord
- Psalms chord
- Thirteenth
- Tristan chord
