= Mode of limited transposition =

Musical modes with repeating intervals

Modes of limited transposition are musical modes or scales that fulfill specific criteria relating to their symmetry and the repetition of their interval groups. These scales may be transposed to all twelve notes of the chromatic scale, but at least two of these transpositions must result in the same pitch classes, thus their transpositions are "limited". They were compiled by the French composer Olivier Messiaen, and published in his book La technique de mon langage musical ("The Technique of my Musical Language").

== Technical criteria ==
Based on our present chromatic system, a tempered system of 12 sounds, these modes are formed of several symmetrical groups, the last note of each group always being common with the first of the following group. At the end of a certain number of chromatic transpositions which varies with each mode, they are no longer transposable, giving exactly the same notes as the first.

There are two complementary ways to view the modes: considering their possible transpositions, and considering the different modes contained within them.

=== Definition by chromatic transposition ===
Transposing the diatonic major scale up in semitones results in a different set of notes being used each time. For example, C major consists of C, D, E, F, G, A, B, and the scale a semitone higher (D♭ major) consists of D♭, E♭, F, G♭, A♭, B♭, C. By transposing D♭ major up another semitone, another new set of notes (D major) is produced, and so on, giving 12 different diatonic scales in total. When transposing a mode of limited transposition this is not the case. For example, the mode of limited transposition that Messiaen labelled "Mode 1", which is the whole tone scale, contains the notes C, D, E, F♯, G♯, A♯; transposing this mode up a semitone produces C♯, D♯, F, G, A, B. Transposing this up another semitone produces D, E, F♯, G♯, A♯, C, which is the same set of notes as the original scale. Since transposing the mode up a whole tone produces the same set of notes, mode 1 has only 2 transpositions.

Any scale having 12 different transpositions is not a mode of limited transposition.

=== Definition by shifting modal degrees ===
Consider the intervals of the major scale: tone, tone, semitone, tone, tone, tone, semitone. Starting the scale on a different degree will always create a new mode with individual interval layouts—for example starting on the second degree of a major scale gives the "Dorian mode"—tone, semitone, tone, tone, tone, semitone, tone. This is not so of the modes of limited transposition, which can be modally shifted only a limited number of times. For example, mode 1, the whole tone scale, contains the intervals tone, tone, tone, tone, tone, tone. Starting on any degree of the mode gives the same sequence of intervals, and therefore the whole tone scale has only 1 mode. Messiaen's mode 2, or the diminished scale, consists of semitone, tone, semitone, tone, semitone, tone, semitone, tone, which can only be arranged 2 ways, starting with either a tone or a semitone. Therefore, mode 2 has two modes.

Any scale having the same number of modes as notes is not a mode of limited transposition.

== Messiaen's list ==
Messiaen's first mode, also called the whole-tone scale, is divided into six groups of two notes each. The intervals it contains are tone, tone, tone, tone, tone, tone – it has two transpositions and one mode.

The second mode, also called the octatonic, diminished, whole-half, or half-whole scale, is divided into four groups of three notes each. It contains the intervals semitone, tone, semitone, tone, semitone, tone, semitone, tone – it has three transpositions, like the diminished 7th chord, and two modes:

The third mode is divided into three groups of four notes each. It contains the intervals tone, semitone, semitone, tone, semitone, semitone, tone, semitone, semitone – it has four transpositions, like the augmented triad, and three modes.

The fourth mode contains the intervals semitone, semitone, minor third, semitone, semitone, semitone, minor third, semitone – it has six transpositions, like the tritone, and four modes.

The fifth mode contains the intervals semitone, major third, semitone, semitone, major third, semitone – it has six transpositions, like the tritone, and three modes.

The sixth mode has the intervals tone, tone, semitone, semitone, tone, tone, semitone, semitone – it has six transpositions, like the tritone, and four modes.

This mode can also be understood as containing the first four notes of one major scale, followed by the first four notes of the major scale beginning on the augmented fourth. In this example, the mode contains the first four notes of the C major scale followed by the first four notes of the F# major scale.

The seventh mode contains the intervals semitone, semitone, semitone, tone, semitone, semitone, semitone, semitone, tone, semitone – it has six transpositions, like the tritone, and five modes.

This mode can also be understood as the intersection of two pentatonic scales separated by an augmented fourth; in this example, the intersection of the F (F, G, A, C and D) and B♮( B, C#, D#, F# and G#) pentatonic scales.

== Expansion and alteration of the modes ==
=== Are there others? ===
Messiaen wrote, "Their series is closed, it is mathematically impossible to find others, at least in our tempered system of 12 semitones." More modes can be found that fit the criteria, but they are truncations of the original seven modes. Indeed, all these modes can be regrouped mathematically speaking in a lattice (wherein one set of notes is connected with those containing it). If one excludes modes with 0, 1, 11 or 12 notes which can be construed as too extreme, there are 15 generalized Messiaen modes which are represented on clock diagrams. Some of the ones omitted by Messiaen are arguably of musical importance, like the hexatonic collection 0 1 4 5 8 9. The augmented scale: 0 3 4 7 8 11 (Root, minor 3rd, major 3rd, 5th, augmented 5th, major 7th, or minor 3rd, semitone, minor 3rd, semitone, minor 3rd, semitone) may appear to be an inexplicable omission on Messiaen's part. It is a symmetrical scale used frequently by modern jazz improvisers. However closer inspection reveals it to be a truncated version of his Third Mode.

=== Complete taxonomy of symmetrical pitch-class sets ===
While Olivier Messiaen stated in The Technique of My Musical Language that his seven modes formed a closed mathematical series, pitch-class set theory demonstrates that twelve-tone equal temperament contains exactly 15 distinct symmetrical pitch-class sets (or 18 if non-palindromic inversions are counted separately) that exhibit limited transposition.

Jazz guitarist and music theorist Masaya Yamaguchi systematically enumerated all 15 mathematically possible symmetrical subsets derived from the chromatic superset—termed Subsets of Limited Transposition (SLT 1–15)—and mapped each subset to its corresponding Messiaen mode (MTL 1–7) in his 1999 book The Complete Thesaurus of Musical Scales and his peer-reviewed paper in Annual Review of Jazz Studies (Vol. 12).

Complete list of the 15 Subsets of Limited Transposition (SLT 1–15) and Messiaen's Modes (MTL 1–7)
No.	Cardinality	Representative scale degrees (Root = 1)	Transpositions	Correspondence to Messiaen's MTL / Common name
SLT 1	2-note	1, ♭5	6	Tritone (subset of MTL 1–7)
SLT 2	3-note	1, 3, ♭6	4	Augmented triad (subset of MTL 1, 3, 6, 7)
SLT 3	4-note	1, ♭2, ♭5, 5	6	Two semitones + tritone (subset of MTL 2–7)
SLT 4	4-note	1, 2, ♭5, ♭6	6	French augmented sixth / Dominant 7♭5 (subset of MTL 1–7)
SLT 5	4-note	1, ♭3, ♭5, 6	3	Diminished seventh chord (subset of MTL 2, 4, 6, 7)
SLT 6	6-note	1, ♭2, 2, ♭5, 5, ♭6	6	Messiaen MTL 5
SLT 7	6-note	1, ♭2, ♭3, ♭5, 5, 6	6	Tritone scale (subset of MTL 2, 4, 6, 7)
SLT 8	6-note	1, ♭2, 3, 4, ♭6, 6	4	Augmented scale / Hexatonic (subset of MTL 3)
SLT 9	6-note	1, 2, ♭3, ♭5, ♭6, 6	6	Symmetrical hexachord (subset of MTL 3, 6, 7)
SLT 10	6-note	1, 2, 3, ♭5, ♭6, ♭7	2	Messiaen MTL 1 (Whole-tone scale)
SLT 11	8-note	1, ♭2, 2, ♭3, ♭5, 5, ♭6, 6	6	Messiaen MTL 4
SLT 12	8-note	1, ♭2, 2, 3, ♭5, 5, ♭6, ♭7	6	Messiaen MTL 6
SLT 13	8-note	1, ♭2, ♭3, 3, ♭5, 5, 6, ♭7	3	Messiaen MTL 2 (Diminished / Octatonic scale)
SLT 14	9-note	1, ♭2, 2, 3, 4, ♭5, ♭6, 6, ♭7	4	Messiaen MTL 3
SLT 15	10-note	1, ♭2, 2, ♭3, 3, ♭5, 5, ♭6, 6, ♭7	6	Messiaen MTL 7

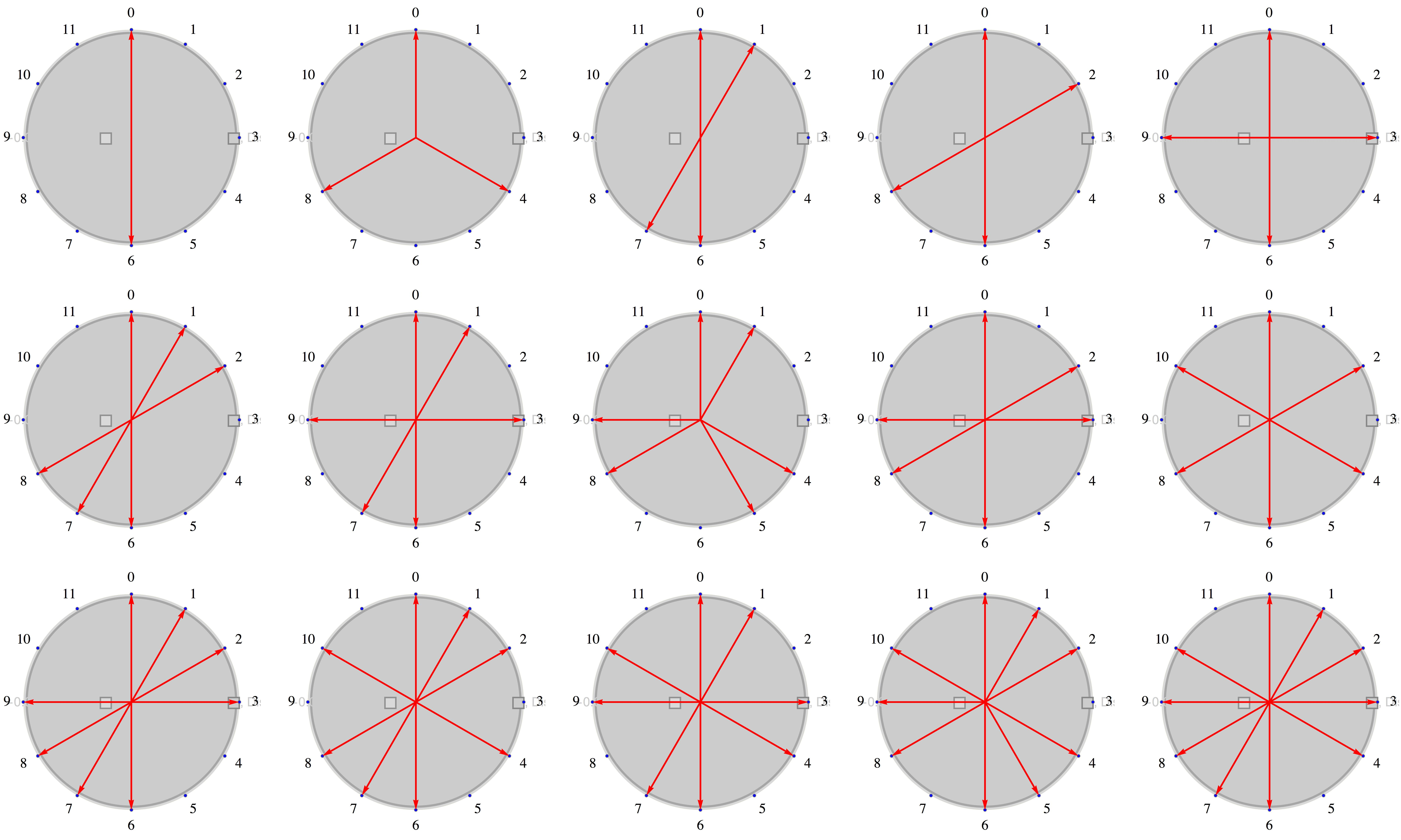
All 15 MTL

=== Truncation ===
Truncation involves the removal of notes from one of the modes to leave a new truncated mode. Both the notes removed and the notes remaining must preserve the symmetry of the parent mode, and must therefore fulfill the conditions for limited transposition. For example, consider mode 1.

- C D E F♯ G♯ A♯

Removing alternate notes creates a new truncated mode of limited transposition.

- C E G♯

Removing two notes for every one kept creates a new truncated mode of limited transposition.

- C F♯

Keeping two notes for every one removed creates another truncated mode of limited transposition.

- C E F♯ A♯

Only Messiaen's mode 7 and mode 3 are not truncated modes: the other modes may be constructed from them or from one or more of their modes. Mode 7 contains modes 1, 2, 4, 5, and 6. Mode 6 contains modes 1 and 5. Mode 4 contains mode 5. Mode 3 contains mode 1.

==== Pure intervallic truncations ====
- Tritones, truncation of modes 1, 2, 3, 4, 5, 6 and 7: augmented fourth, augmented fourth – 1 mode and 6 transpositions
- Major thirds, truncation of modes 1, 3, 6 and 7: major third, major third, major third – 1 mode and 4 transpositions. See Augmented triad
- Minor thirds, truncation of modes 2, 4, 6 and 7: minor third, minor third, minor third, minor third – 1 mode and 3 transpositions. See Diminished seventh chord
- Whole tones (mode 1), truncation of modes 3, 6 and 7: tone, tone, tone, tone, tone, tone – 1 mode and 2 transpositions

==== Other truncations ====
- Truncation of modes 2, 4, 6 and 7: semitone, tone, minor third, semitone, tone, minor third – 3 modes, 6 transpositions. (Modes are "mirror" inversions of Petrushka Chord modes.)
- Truncation of modes 1, 2, 3, 4, 5, 6 and 7: major third, tone, major third, tone – 2 modes, 6 transpositions. See French Sixth and Dominant seventh flat five chord
- Truncation of modes 2, 3, 4, 5, 6 and 7: perfect fourth, semitone, perfect fourth, semitone – 2 modes, 6 transpositions. See 1:5 Distance model
- Truncation of mode 3: minor third, semitone, minor third, semitone, minor third, semitone – 2 modes, 4 transpositions. See augmented scale
- Truncation of modes 2, 4, 6 and 7: minor third, tone, semitone, minor third, tone, semitone – 3 modes, 6 transpositions. See Petrushka Chord

== Use and sound ==
Messiaen found ways of employing all of the modes of limited transposition harmonically, melodically, and sometimes polyphonically. The whole-tone and octatonic scales have enjoyed quite widespread use since the turn of the 20th century, particularly by Debussy (the whole-tone scale) and Stravinsky (the octatonic scale).

The symmetry inherent in these modes (which means no note can be perceived as the tonic), together with certain rhythmic devices, Messiaen described as containing "the charm of impossibilities".

The composer Tōru Takemitsu made frequent use of Messiaen's modes, particularly the third mode. The composer Alexander Tcherepnin has adopted the third mode as one of his synthetic scales, and it is known as the "Tcherepnin scale".

== In other temperaments ==
There are no modes of limited transposition in any prime equal division of the octave, such as 19 equal temperament or 31 equal temperament.

Composite divisions, such as 15 equal temperament or 22 equal temperament, have them. The 12-note chromatic scale can itself be considered such a mode when viewed as a subset of a larger system that contains it, such as quarter tones or 72 equal temperament.

8-tet
Scale step	0	1	2	3	4	5	6	7
Cents	0	150	300	450	600	750	900	1050
Note	C	D/C	E♭/D♯	F/E	G♭/F♯	A/G	A	B/A

For example, eight equal temperament, the lowest non-prime equal temperament not completely included in 12-tet (due to a scale step in 24-tet), would have modes of limited transposition. The first would be 0, 2, 4, 6 (steps: 2222), which has only two transpositions and one mode. Another would be 0, 1, 4, 5 (steps: 1313 and 3131), which has 4 transpositions and 2 modes (the other is 0, 3, 4, 7).
