= Synthetic mode =

A synthetic mode is a mode that cannot be derived from the diatonic scale by starting on a different note. Whereas the seven modes are all derived from the same scale and therefore can coincide with each other (e.g. B Locrian, A Aeolian, and D Dorian all share the same notes with the C Major Scale), synthetic modes work differently.

== Symmetric diminished and inverse symmetric diminished scales ==
These two modes, which are mirror image to each other and are also transpositions of each other, are created by dividing the octave into four equal parts and adding an interval of either half a step or a whole step to each resulting note. As such, they are both symmetric scales and are used in diminished context, albeit in a different manner. They are also the result of superimposing two diminished seventh chords set either half a step or a whole step from each other.

The symmetric diminished scale, also known as "half-whole", goes as follows:

1 ♭2 ♯2 3 ♯4 5 6 ♭7

It can be applied to a dominant chord, the root of which can be equally transposed to any note of the diminished seventh chord built on the root. For example, this scale starting on C (C D♭ D♯ E F♯ G A B♭) can be applied to either C7, A7, F♯7 or E♭7.

The inverse symmetric diminished scale, also known as "whole-half", goes as follows:

1 2 ♭3 4 ♭5 ♭6 7 (♮)7

This scale is used as the chord scale for the diminished seventh chord. Naturally, as the diminished seventh chord is symmetric and therefore, sounds the same when started from either note, the same goes for the scale. For example, this scale starting on C (C D E♭ F G♭ A♭ B B(♮)) can be applied to C^{o}7, which in turn is enharmonically equivalent to A^{o}7, F♯^{o}7 or E♭^{o}7. Note that the diminished chord is always tense and its seventh is double flattened (7); therefore, only in diminished context can a ♭6 (or ♭13) be played simultaneously with what is the enharmonic equivalent of a ♮6 (voiced only a major seventh above it or a minor second below it, the latter being only valid in piano voicings, but never a minor ninth below it). It is also the only context where the major seventh is considered a tension, rather than a chord tone. Similarly, only in Dorian/Mixolydian context can a ♮6 (or ♮13) be played simultaneously with what is the enharmonic equivalent of an augmented 6th (voiced only a major seventh above it or a minor second below it, the latter being only valid in piano voicings, but never a minor ninth below it). Also, only in Aeolian/Phrygian context can a ♭6 (or ♭13) be played simultaneously with the ♮5 (voiced only a major seventh above it or a minor second below it, the latter being only valid in piano voicings, but never a minor ninth below it).

== Hexatonic scales ==
Those are six-note scales, which are usually created by superimposing two mutually exclusive triads. Hexatonic scales often function as the solution to having a common scale to improvise while cycling through unusual chord progressions or hybrid chords.

Example: the three-tonic cycle normally requires changing "key notes" to emphasize each modulation. If we look for one scale that can fit all the chords, the first logical thing to do is to try and combine the triad notes of all tonics. Suppose we start the cycle with C major, our pitches will be: C E G, E G♯ B, and A♭[G♯] C E♭[D♯]. These notes form the following scale:

C D♯ E G A♭ B (C)

Essentially, these are C augmented and B augmented triads superimposed over each other. Such structuring, as always, produces a symmetric scale.

== See also ==
- Synthetic chord
