= Major fourth and minor fifth =

Major fourth
- Inverse: Minor fifth

Name
- Other names: Eleventh harmonic Paramajor fourth
- Abbreviation: M4

Size
- Semitones: ~5½
- Interval class: ~5½
- Just interval: 11:8

Cents
- 24-Tone equal temperament: 550
- Just intonation: 551.32

Minor fifth
- Inverse: Major fourth

Name
- Other names: Eleventh subharmonic Paraminor fifth
- Abbreviation: m5

Size
- Semitones: ~6½
- Interval class: ~5½
- Just interval: 16:11

Cents
- 24-Tone equal temperament: 650
- Just intonation: 648.68

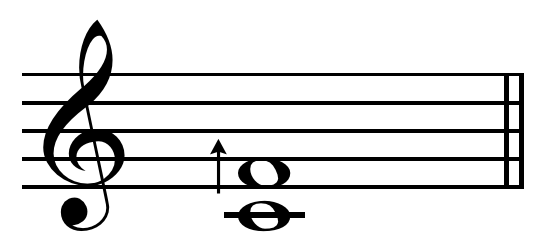
The eleventh harmonic – shown using the Ben Johnston notation – can be approximated by the major fourth.

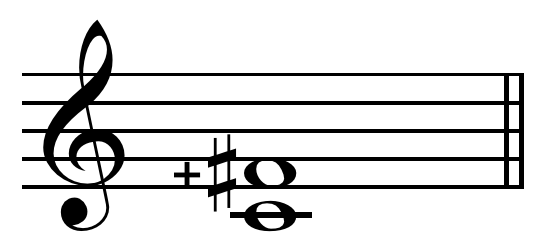
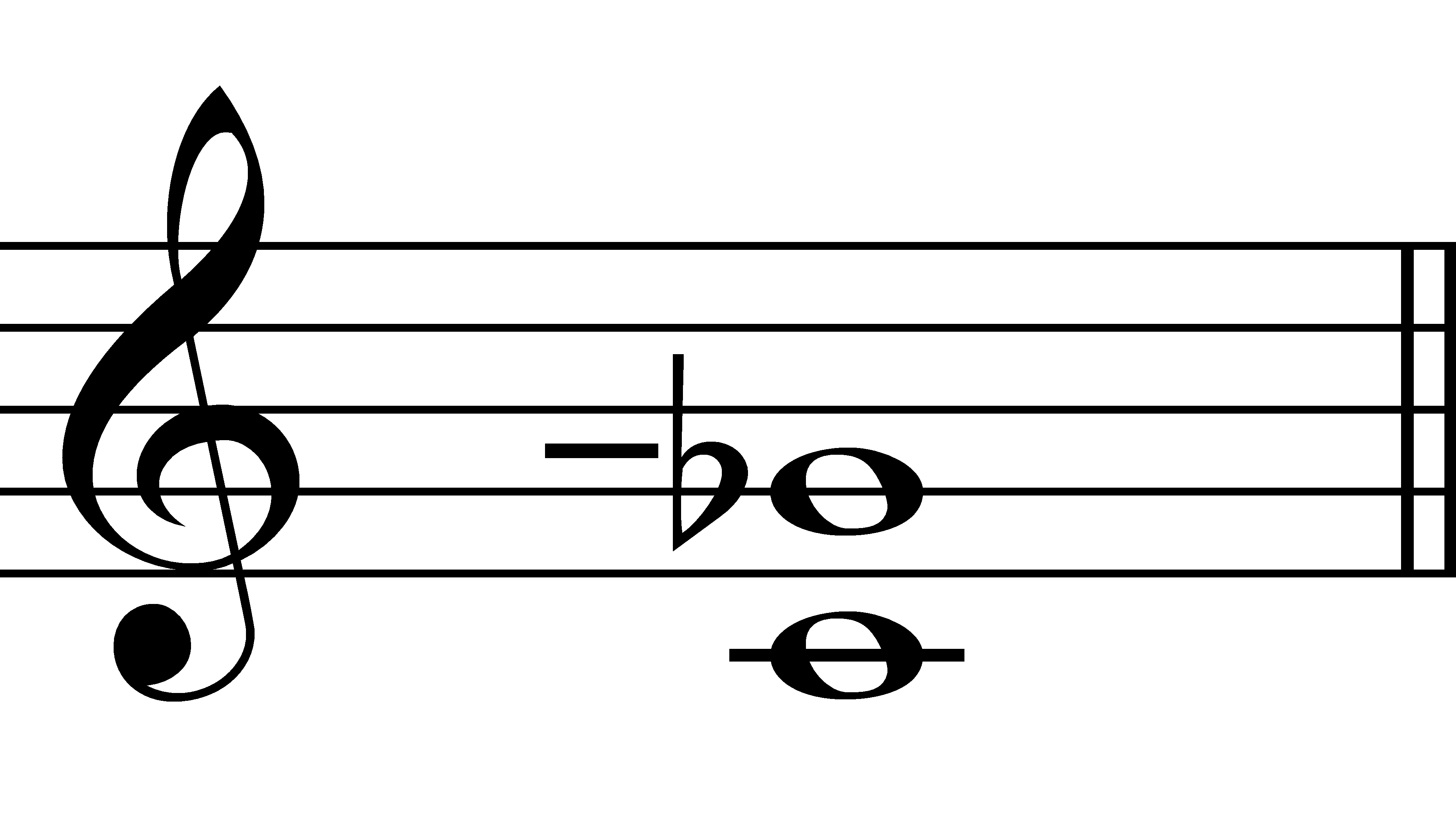
Just augmented fourth on C and its inverse, the just tritone on C

In music, the major fourth and minor fifth, also known as the paramajor fourth and paraminor fifth, are intervals from the quarter-tone scale, named by Ivan Wyschnegradsky to describe the tones surrounding the tritone (F♯/G♭) found in the more familiar twelve-tone scale, as shown in the table below:

| | perfect fourth | (para)major fourth | tritone | (para)minor fifth | perfect fifth |
|---|---|---|---|---|---|
| In C: | F | ≊ F | F♯/G♭ | ≊ G | G |
| In cents: | 500 | 550 | 600 | 650 | 700 |

== Major fourth ==
A major fourth is the interval that lies midway between the perfect fourth (500 cents) and the augmented fourth (600 cents) and is thus 550 cents (F). It inverts to a minor fifth. Wyschnegradsky considered it a good approximation of the eleventh harmonic (11:8 or 551.32 cents). A narrower undecimal major fourth is found at 537 cents (the ratio 15:11). 31 equal temperament has an interval of 542 cents, which lies in between the two types of undecimal major fourth.

The term may also be applied to the "comma-deficient major fourth" (or "chromatic major fourth"), which is the ratio 25:18, or 568.72 cents (F♯).

== Minor fifth ==
A minor fifth is the interval midway between the diminished fifth (600 cents) and the perfect fifth (700 cents) and thus 650 cents (G). It inverts to a major fourth. It approximates the eleventh subharmonic (G↓), 16:11 (648.68 cents).

The term may also be applied to the ratio 64:45 (G♭-) or 609.77 cents, formed from the perfect fourth (4/3 = 498.04) and the major semitone (16/15 = 111.73), which is sharp of the G♭ tritone. The "comma-redundant minor fifth" has the ratio 36:25 (G♭), or 631.28 cents, and is formed from two minor thirds. The tridecimal minor fifth (13:9), or tridecimal tritone, is slightly larger at 636.6 cents.

== Other ==
The term major fourth may also be applied to the follow, as minor fifth may be applied to their inversions (in the sense of augmented and diminished):

- The "comma-deficient major fourth" (or "chromatic major fourth") is the ratio 25:18, or 568.72 cents (F♯).
- 45:32 (F♯+) or 590.22 cents, formed from the major third (5/4 = 386.31) and the major tone (9/8 = 203.91) or two major tones (9:8) and one minor tone (10:9)
- 729:512 (F♯++) or 611.73 cents, formed from the perfect fourth and the apotome.

== See also ==
- Subminor and supermajor
- Neutral interval
