= Masaya Yamaguchi =

American jazz musician

Masaya Yamaguchi (born July 18, 1970) is a guitarist and educator residing in Manhattan, New York City.

== Career ==
Yamaguchi grew up in Tokyo, Japan and decided to study in the U.S. at the age of 26. He became the first Japanese person to complete the master's program in Jazz Performance at City College of New York (M.A. 1999). He has written for Down Beat magazine and Annual Review of Jazz Studies, which is peer reviewed and published by the Institute of Jazz Studies at Rutgers University.

According to his profile in Marquis Who's Who in America, Yamaguchi has been a musician and educator who established his conceptual system to explore the imaginative formation of musical scales in The Complete Thesaurus of Musical Scales. His representative work, The Complete Thesaurus of Musical Scales was reviewed by John Kuzmich (senior columnist of Jazz Education Journal, International Association for Jazz Education) as "It's worth mentioning that this book comprehensively covers all theoretical possibilities in constructing scales...Take this Thesaurus Scales seriously, you will not be disappointed in the options available for jazz improvisation." "The Subsets of Limited Transposition" (which takes Olivier Messiaen's Modes of limited transposition and updates it) and "Appendix: Scales for Jazz Improvisation" in The Complete Thesaurus of Musical Scales are very helpful to organize musician's mind and ear. "The Subsets of Limited Transposition" was introduced in The Complete Thesaurus of Musical Scales, "Symmetrical Scales for Jazz Improvisation" and his academic article, "A Creative Approach to Multi-Tonic Changes: Beyond Coltrane's Harmonic Formula (Annual Review of Jazz Studies 12, 2002)." The concept of "The Subsets of Limited Transposition" has been updated by the "Lexicon of Geometric Patterns for Jazz Improvisation" as "Systematized The Subsets of Limited Transposition Families." Chapter VI of "Lexicon of Geometric Patterns for Jazz Improvisation" is also given to "Messiaen's Modes for Jazz Improvisation"

Masaya Yamaguchi is also known as a scholar and researcher of the music of Charlie Parker and John Coltrane. David Damsey is a co-author of John Coltrane Plays Coltrane Changes and a professor of music and coordinator of jazz studies at William Paterson University. In 2019, Yamaguchi published Miles Davis: New Research on Miles Davis & His Circle, featuring a foreword by Dave Liebman. The following year, the work was nominated for the Jazz Journalists Association (JJA) Jazz Award for "Book of the Year About Jazz."

== Selected works ==
- The Complete Thesaurus of Musical Scales (New York: Charles Colin Publications, 1999, Masaya Music, Revised 2006) ISBN 0967635306
- Pentatonicism in Jazz: Creative Aspects and Practice (New York: Charles Colin Publications, 2002, Masaya Music, Revised 2006) ISBN 0967635314
- Symmetrical Scales for Jazz Improvisation (New York: Charles Colin Publications, 2001, Masaya Music, Revised 2006) ISBN 0967635322
- Lexicon of Geometric Patterns for Jazz Improvisation (Masaya Music, 2012) ISBN 0967635330
- YAMAGUCHI Improvisation Method (Masaya Music, 2012) ISBN 0967635349
- Chromaticism in Jazz: Applying Techniques and Concepts (Masaya Music, 2012) ISBN 0967635357
- The Bird Book (The Charlie Parker Real Book) (Milwaukee: Hal Leonard Corporation, 2012) ISBN 1423495659
- John Coltrane Plays Coltrane Changes (Milwaukee: Hal Leonard Corporation, 2003) ISBN 0634038648
- Charlie Parker Yardbird Originals (New York: Charles Colin Publications, 2005) originally published in 1955
- YAMAGUCHI Guitar Method (Masaya Music, 2013) ISBN 0967635365
- Contemporary Guitar Harmony: For Advanced Guitarists Only (Masaya Music, 2013) ISBN 0967635373
- Sonny Rollins with the Modern Jazz Quartet [B-flat Tenor key] (Milwaukee: Hal Leonard Corporation, 2013) ISBN 1476814562
- Synthetic Scales for Jazz Improvisation: Two-Octave and Multi-Octave Scales (Masaya Music, 2013) ISBN 096763539X
- Color Harmony Compendium in Music (Masaya Music, 2013) ISBN 0967635381
- All Fourths: A Method For EADGCF Tuning On Guitar (Masaya Music, 2018) ISBN 0999878409
- Miles Davis: New Research on Miles Davis & His Circle <USA edition> (Foreword by Dave Liebman) (Masaya Music, 2019) ISBN 978-0999878422
- Miles Davis: New Research on Miles Davis & His Circle <International Edition> English edition for Non-USA countries(Masaya Music, 2019) ISBN 978-0999878446

=== Works in Japanese ===
- Jazz Approach ni yoru Daionkai Jiten ジャズ・アプローチによる音階大辞典(July, 2011, Tokyo: Doremi Music Publishing. Co., Ltd.) ISBN 4285130777
- Jazz Approach ni yoru Onkai Kyohon <Symmetrical Scales Hen> ジャズ・アプローチによる音階教本＜シンメトリカル・スケール編＞(September, 2011, Tokyo: Doremi Music Publishing. Co., Ltd.) ISBN 4285130785
- Jazz Approach ni yoru Onkai Kyohon <Pentatonic Scales Hen> ジャズ・アプローチによる音階教本＜ペンタトニック・スケール編＞(September, 2011, Tokyo: Doremi Music Publishing. Co., Ltd.) ISBN 4285130793

=== Selected articles ===
- A Creative Approach to Multi-Tonic Changes: Beyond Coltrane's Harmonic Formula, Annual Review of Jazz Studies 12, 2002 (Rutgers University/Scarecrow Press) (June 14, 2004)
- John Coltrane and Carlos Salzedo: A Surprising Connection, The American Harp Journal, Vol.23, No.2, Winter 2011, p. 59.
- Note Groups of Limited Transposition: A Key to Unlocking Multitonic Change Possibilities," Down Beat 67, No.9 (September 2000), p. 70.
