= Psalms chord =

Chord

Component intervals from root
- minor tenth
- perfect fifth
- minor third
- root

Forte no. / Complement
- 3-11 / 9-11

In music, the Psalms chord is the opening chord of Igor Stravinsky's Symphony of Psalms. It is a "barking E minor triad" that is voiced "like no E-minor triad that was ever known before" – that is, in two highly separate groups, one in the top register and the other in the bottom register. The third of the E-minor triad, rather than the tonic, receives strong emphasis.

It is common to the octatonic scale and the Phrygian scale on E, and the contrasting sections of the first movement based on the scales are linked by statements of the Psalms chord.

William W. Austin describes the Psalms chord in the following way: "The opening staccato blast, which recurs throughout the first movement, detached from its surroundings by silence, seems to be a perverse spacing of the E minor triad, with the minor third doubled in four octaves while the root and fifth appear only twice, at high and low extremes."

== See also ==
- Elektra chord
- Mystic chord
- Petrushka chord
- Psalms
- Tristan chord
