= Hexatonic scale =

Scale with six pitches

In music and music theory, a hexatonic scale is a scale with six pitches or notes per octave. Famous examples include the whole-tone scale, C D E F♯ G♯ A♯ C; the augmented scale, C D♯ E G A♭ B C; the Prometheus scale, C D E F♯ A B♭ C; and the blues scale, C E♭ F G♭ G B♭ C. A hexatonic scale can also be formed by stacking perfect fifths. This results in a diatonic scale with one note removed (for example, A C D E F G).

== Whole-tone scale ==
The whole-tone scale is a series of whole tones. It has two non-enharmonically equivalent positions: C D E F♯ G♯ A♯ C and D♭ E♭ F G A B D♭. It is primarily associated with the French impressionist composer Claude Debussy, who used it in such pieces of his as Voiles and Le vent dans la plaine, both from his first book of piano Préludes.

This whole-tone scale has appeared occasionally and sporadically in jazz at least since Bix Beiderbecke's impressionistic piano piece In a Mist. Bop pianist Thelonious Monk often interpolated whole-tone scale flourishes into his improvisations and compositions.

== Mode-based hexatonic scale ==
The major hexatonic scale is made from a major scale and removing the seventh note, e.g., C D E F G A C. It can also be made from superimposing mutually exclusive triads, e.g., C E G and D F A.

Similarly, the minor hexatonic scale is made from a minor scale by removing the sixth note, e.g., C D E♭ F G B♭ C.

Irish and Scottish and many other folk traditions use six-note scales. They can be easily described by the addition of two triads a tone apart, e.g., Am and G in "Shady Grove", or omitting the fourth or sixth from the seven-note diatonic scale.

Mode	I	II	III	IV	V	VI
Name	Major hexatonic	Minor hexatonic	Ritsu Onkai	Raga Kumud	Mixolydian hexatonic	Phrygian hexatonic
Notes	1 2 3 4 5 6	1 2 ♭3 4 5 ♭7	1 ♭2 ♭3 4 ♭6 ♭7	1 2 3 5 6 7	1 2 4 5 6 ♭7	1 ♭3 4 5 ♭6 ♭7
Based on modes	Ionian; Mixolydian	Dorian; Aeolian	Phrygian; Phrygian Dominant; Locrian	Lydian; Ionian	Mixolydian; Dorian	Aeolian; Phrygian
Omitted note	7	6	5	4	3	2

Based on modes	Ionian; Major; Mixolydian; Major ♭7; Major ♯ 7	Dorian; Minor 6; Aeolian; Minor	Phrygian; Locrian	Lydian; Ionian	Mixolydian; Dorian	Aeolian; Phrygian; Major ♭2 ♭3 ♭6 ♭7
Omitted note	7	6	5	4	3	2

== Augmented scale ==
The augmented scale, also known in jazz theory as the symmetrical augmented scale, is so called because it can be thought of as an interlocking combination of two augmented triads an augmented second or minor third apart: C E G♯ and E♭ G B. It may also be called the "minor-third half-step scale", owing to the series of intervals produced.

It made one of its most celebrated early appearances in Franz Liszt's Faust Symphony (Eine Faust Symphonie). Another famous use of the augmented scale (in jazz) is in Oliver Nelson's solo on "Stolen Moments". It is also prevalent in 20th century compositions by Alberto Ginastera, Almeida Prado, Béla Bartók, Milton Babbitt, and Arnold Schoenberg, by saxophonists John Coltrane and Oliver Nelson in the late 1950s and early 1960s, and bandleader Michael Brecker. Alternating E major and C minor triads form the augmented scale in the opening bars of the Finale in Shostakovich's Second Piano Trio.

== Prometheus scale ==
The Prometheus scale is so called because of its prominent use in Alexander Scriabin's symphonic poem Prometheus: The Poem of Fire. Scriabin himself called this set of pitches, voiced as the simultaneity (in ascending order) C F♯ B♭ E A D the "mystic chord". Others have referred to it as the "Promethean chord". It may be thought of as C Lydian-Mixolydian.

It can also be though as a triad pair: a minor triad and an augmented triad 1/2 step up. For example, A minor triad and B flat augmented triad.

== Blues scale ==
The blues scale is so named for its use of blue notes. Since blue notes are alternate inflections, strictly speaking there can be no one blues scale, but the scale most commonly called "the blues scale" comprises the minor pentatonic scale and an additional flat 5th scale degree: C E♭ F G♭ G B♭ C.

== Tritone scale ==
The tritone scale, C D♭ E G♭ G(♮) B♭, is enharmonically equivalent to the Petrushka chord; it means a C major chord (C E G(♮)) + G♭ major chord's 2nd inversion (D♭ G♭ B♭).

The two-semitone tritone scale, C D♭ D F♯ G A♭, is a symmetric scale consisting of a repeated pattern of two semitones followed by a major third now used for improvisation and may substitute for any mode of the jazz minor scale. The scale originated in Nicolas Slonimsky's book Thesaurus of Scales and Melodic Patterns through the "equal division of one octave into two parts," creating a tritone, and the "interpolation of two notes," adding two consequent semitones after the two resulting notes. The scale is the fifth mode of Messiaen's list.

== See also ==
- Hexachord
- Istrian scale
