= Leonid Sabaneyev =

Russian composer (1881–1963)

- Леонид Сабанеев
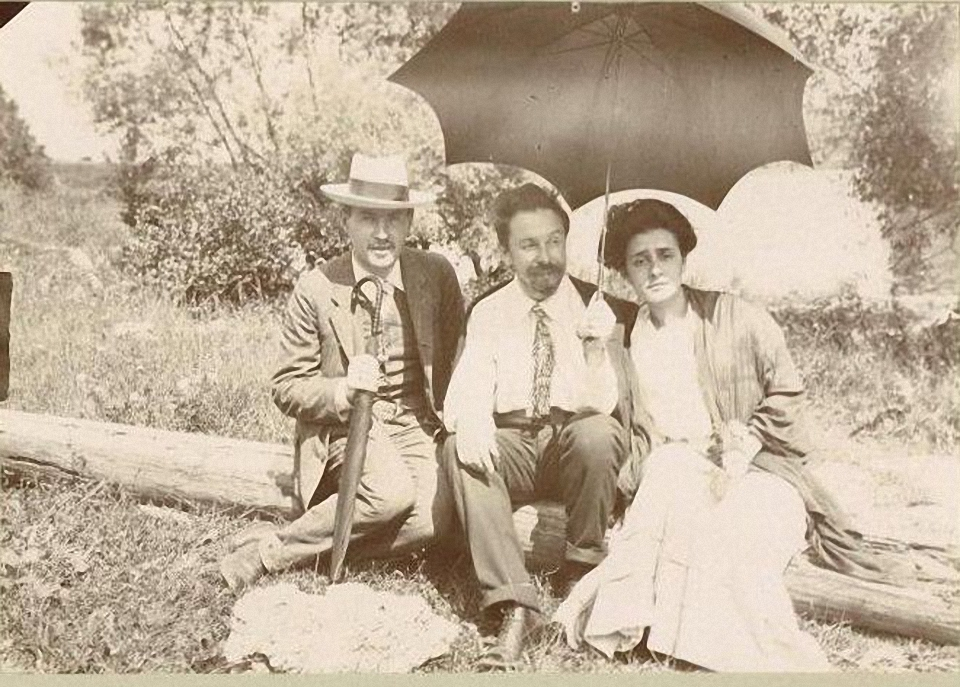
- Sabaneyev, Alexander Scriabin and Tatyana Schlözer, summer 1912
- Born: 19 September 1881; Moscow, Russia
- Died: 3 May 1963 (aged 81); Cap d'Antibes, France
- Education: Moscow Conservatory
- Occupations: Composer; musicologist; music critic
- Parent: Leonid Pavlovich Sabaneyev

Leonid Leonidovich Sabaneyev (also spelled Sabaneyeff or Sabaneev; Russian: Леони́д Леони́дович Сабане́ев; 1 October [O.S. 19 September] 1881 – 3 May 1968) was a Russian musicologist, music critic, composer and scientist. He was the son of Leonid Pavlovich Sabaneyev, a famous zoologist hunting expert, and his brother Boris was also a musician.

== Biography ==
Leonid Sabaneyev was born in Moscow in 1881 and his musical studies were under Nikolai Rimsky-Korsakov, Sergei Taneyev, Nikolai Zverev and Paul de Schlözer at the Moscow Conservatory. He graduated in mathematics and physics from Moscow University in 1908. He wrote some early works, such as incidental music to King Oedipus (1889), a Funeral March in Memory of Beethoven, two trios (including a Trio-Impromptu for violin, cello and piano, Op. 4), piano pieces (including a Piano Sonata, Op. 15), and songs.

He then made a special study of Alexander Scriabin, and became an authority on that composer (see synthetic chord). His first book on Scriabin was published in 1916. In addition to his own original works, he transcribed Scriabin's Prometheus: The Poem of Fire for 2 pianos. He founded the Moscow Institute of Musicology. He was both a conservative and a progressive; his ideas included a scale comprising 53 notes, and hoped to create a "Laboratory of the Exact Science of Music".

Sabaneyev famously embarrassed himself in 1916 by publishing a scathing review of the premiere of Prokofiev's Scythian Suite – a performance that had actually been canceled at the last minute. This prompted a response from Prokofiev stating that the supposed performance must have been a product of Sabaneyev's imagination, as the only copy of the score was in the composer's hands and thus the critic had not even been able to see it. However, later Prokofiev said that Sabaneyev had information about the Suite from his friends who had already heard the Suite and he probably wouldn't have changed a word in his review even if he had heard it in concert.

Sabaneyev left Russia in 1926, after publishing Scriabin (1916, 2/1923), History of Russian Music (1924), The General History of Music (1925), and Music After October (on post-revolution music in Russia). History of Russian Music was translated into German (1926) and received very positive reviews from critics such as Maurice Cauchie. In his later years he lived in Paris, London, the United States, and Nice, where he is buried. His musicological works from this period include Modern Russian Composers (1927), a monograph on Taneyev (1930), and Music for the Films (1935). His students in Paris included the Swedish composers Dag Wirén and Gösta Nystroem.

His later musical works included a ballet, a symphonic poem, and the oratorio The Revelation of St John (1940). He also wrote Variations on a Theme of Scriabin, for unknown forces.

He also had several science works on mathematics and zoology.

He died in Cap d'Antibes, France, on 3 May 1968.

== List of main compositions ==
- Two trios for violin, cello and piano (1907 and 1924)
- Sonata for violin and piano
- Sonata "à la mémoire de Scriabine" (1916–1917)
- Chaconne for organ and orchestra (op. 21, not later 1924)
- Ballet Aviatrice (1928)
- Tragic epopeia for orchestra (1928)
- Flots d'azur (symphonic poem) (1936)
- Passacaglia (for orchestra) (1935)
- Suite for two pianos (1938)
- Apocalypse (for soloists, choir, organ and orchestra) (1940)
- Many romances for voice and piano
- Many small pieces for piano (including Prelude Op. 10 No. 5 popularised in concerts by Marc-André Hamelin)

== Sources ==
- Grove's Dictionary of Music, 5th ed., 1954, Vol. VII, p. 343, Eric Blom, ed.
- V. L. Sabaneyeva-Lanskaya. "Leonid Leonidovich Sabaneyev" (in: L. L. Sabaneyev Reminiscences about Russia), Moscow: Klassika-XXI, 2005.
