= Synthetic chord =

Non-traditional, custom-built chord

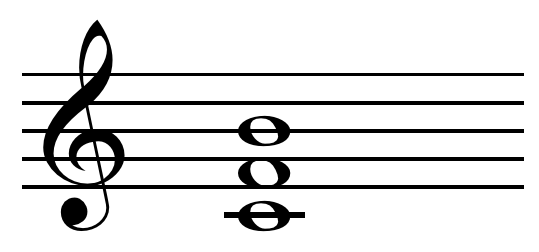
C-F-B chord, according to Schoenberg a, "synthetic chord which differs considerably from the original scale harmonies". See: quartal and quintal harmony.

C-E-G, major triad, a traditional chord.

In music theory and harmonic analysis, a synthetic chord is a made-up or non-traditional (synthetic) chord (collection of pitches) which cannot be analyzed in terms of traditional harmonic structures, such as the triad or seventh chord.

This title is applied to a group of notes, usually a scale-like succession of pitches, with a fixed progression of tones and semitones. This scale can obviously be transposed to any pitch, and depending on its intervallic makeup, will have a fixed number of possible transpositions. Furthermore, the sintetakkord can be used either vertically or horizontally; Roslavets' music is not concerned with the order of the pitches, but rather with the whole 'field' thus created, so that the system is less oriented toward themes and more toward harmonic fields. [See: Josef Matthias Hauer]

— Sitsky (1994),

However, synthetic chords originated not with Roslavets but with musicologist Sabaneev and his study of composer Scriabin's Prometheus published in 1910. See: Mystic chord.

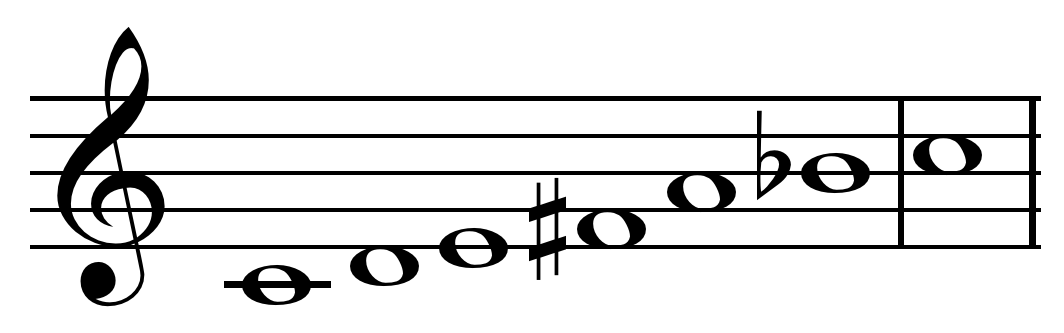
Prometheus scale on C, whole tone scale with one degree altered chromatically.

For example, if a composer uses a synthetic scale as the basis for a passage of music and constructs chords from its tones, in much the same way that a tonal composer may use a major or minor scale's notes to build harmonies, then the resulting chords may be synthetic chords and referred to as such.

Some synthetic chords may be analyzed as traditional chords, including the Prometheus chord, which may be analyzed as an altered dominant chord.

An example of a synthetic chord would be the repeated chord in the first act of Puccini's Turandot at the beginning of the text passage "Non indugiare, se chiami appare...".

== See also ==
- Synthetic mode
