= Synthetic scale =

Class of musical scales

In music, a synthetic scale is a scale that derives from a traditional diatonic major scale by altering of one degree by a semitone in either direction. Composer Ferruccio Busoni originally explored these scales in his A New Esthetic of Music and their number and variety were later clarified by J. Murray Barbour, who also proposed applying the procedure to scales of more or less than seven degrees, including pentatonic scales.

These synthetic pitch collections may serve as basic melodic or harmonic material for a passage of music. However, the hundreds of available scales cause Murray Barbour to propose that, "The whole problem is of greater theoretical interest than of practical worth."

Alexander Scriabin's mystic chord, when considered as a scale (the Prometheus scale), is an example of a synthetic chord—in that it is a whole tone scale with one degree altered. However, it was not the generating element to Scriabin's music, nor does his derivation of it from the whole tone scale necessarily indicate knowledge of Busoni's theories. Starting on C, the Prometheus scale is

The semitone steps for this scale are 2, 2, 2, 3, 1, 2. By adding a G to the scale, one would end up with the Lydian♭VII, the fourth degree of the Melodic Minor scale.

The pitches of synthetic scales may duplicate pre-existing scales, though their derivation is different and their use is often quite different.

== See also ==
- Harmonic major scale
- Jazz minor scale
