= List of general music articles in Rees's Cyclopaedia =

The music articles in the Rees's Cyclopaedia were written by Charles Burney (1726–1814), with additional material by John Farey Sr (1766–1826), and John Farey Jr (1791–1851).The Cyclopædia was illustrated using 53 plates as well as a numerous examples of music typset within the articles.

The general musical articles list all those that are not biographical, which form a separate list. They were written mostly by Charles Burney. Others on the scientific basis of music were by John Farey Sr, and technical descriptions of some musical instruments were given by his son.

It had been Burney's intention to write a Dictionary of Music, but for various reasons he never did so. In 1801 when he was aged 75 he was offered the chance of writing music articles in Rees's Cyclopaedia, and this occupied him to around 1805 or '06. His fee was £1000. Burney's brief was to 'include definitions in all the languages of Europe where Music has been much cultivated, with its history, biography, Criticism and discussions'

The articles contain an enormous amount of musical information, much of which being augmented versions of what he had already published in his earlier writings In addition, he took the opportunity to add new topics covering the years of the last quarter of the eighteenth century and much of the first decade of the nineteenth, in particular the London musical scene. In all he wrote 996 general articles. While the majority of the articles have some length, a good proportion are brief (3 or 4 lines or fewer), dictionary definitions, or cross references. Many of the former are terms derived from French and Italian. The encyclopaedic-length articles (as distinct from the dictionary-length articles) are usually longer than Burney's earlier published writings on the same topic.

Dr Percy Scholes cites a statement by Dr Rees from Preface to the Cyclopaedia that he had 'constantly interpolated his own additions to the articles of his specialists'. and quotes a passage from the article about Dance (Vol 11) describing 'in our own memory', Welsh church-goers being played out of church by a fiddle.

John Farey, sr was by profession a geologist, but was greatly interested music. He was involved with the Choral Fund, the Cecilian Society and the Surrey Chapel Society, and also sang in oratorios in Drury Lane Theatre. He was particularly interested in the mathematics of music and temperament, and wrote all the 215 scientific articles on these topics for Rees. Farey's investigations of temperament involved discussing (and criticising) the various schemes in use then. He described them in a series of letters to the Philosophical Magazine, and the Monthly Magazine as well as the American Journal of Science. He also contributed 25 articles to the Edinburgh Encyclopædia on this topic .

John Farey, jr was a prolific contributor to Rees's Cyclopaedia, not only as a writer but also as an artist of many of the plates. For the four articles he wrote, he drew plates for two illustrating John Isaac Hawkins's Finger-keyed Viol, and two different patterns of pipe organ. The plates were keyed to the texts of the articles, and for this reason it was necessary for Farey to have produced both, since writing the texts describing the plates would have required technical knowledge which Burney would not have possessed.

Alphabetisation of articles:
The work followed the common practice of conflating the letters I and J and U and V into single sequences. The topics included in this list therefore follow the sequence they appear in the original volumes.

Annotations:
The articles are annotated to Mercer's edition of Burney's History (1935) and Scholes's edition of Burney's travels, Travels (1959). Where a page reference is given the text can be found there. Where a book is cited, but with no page, index entries were found, and Burney is presumed to have written his article using the information there. Where there is no annotation, the article must be unique to the Cyclopaedia.

== Vol 1 A-Amarathides ==
Topic	Sub-Topic	Columns	Contributor/Notes
Abyssinian Music	-	1 line	Burney. See Burney's History, Mercer's ed. Cross-referenced to Music
Academy	Academy, Musical	0.6	Burney. See Burney's History, Mercer's ed.
Accelerando	-	0.3	Burney.
Accent	-	1.0	Burney. See Burney's History, Mercer's ed.
Acciacatura	-	0.3.	Burney.
Accompaniment	-	3.0	Burney. See Burney's History, Mercer's ed. Cross-referenced to Harmony, Chords, Thorough-Bass, Regle De L'octave, Figuring a base and Recitative
Acute	-	0.4	Burney. cross-referenced to Harmony
Adagio	-	0.3	Burney.
Agente	-	0.1	Burney. With example of notation.
Agoge in Ancient Music	-	0.4	Burney.
Air	Air, in music	4.4	Burney. See Burney's History, Mercer's ed. Cross-referenced to Philodemus, Chant, Canto Fermo, Bells, Carillon, Changes, Melody, Song, Tune, Opera.
A-la-mi-re	-	0.2	Burney. With example of notation. Cross-referenced to Gamut and Guidonian Scale
Allegro	-	0.1	Burney. Cros-referenced to Andante and Presto
Al Segno	-	0.1	Burney.
Alto & Basso	Alto, high	0.2	Burney. With example of notation.

== Vol 2 Amarantus-Arteriotomy ==
Topic	Sub-Topic	Columns	Contributor/Notes
Andante	-	0.1	Burney
Anticipation	Anticipation, in music	1.5	Burney. With example of notation. Cross-referenced to Suspension
Antiphonary	-	0.3	Burney. See Burney's History, Mercer's ed.
Antiphony	-	0.9	Burney. See Burney's History, Mercer's ed.
Appoggiatura	-	1.0	Burney. With examples of notation. Cross-referenced to Reciative
Appreciation	-	1.6	Burney. Cross-referenced to Bruit
Arabic	Arabian music	1.5	Burney.
Aria	Aria, in music	0.4	Burney. See Burney's History, Mercer's ed .
Arietta	-	0.2	Burney.
Armonica	-	2.8	Burney.
Arpeggio	-	0.3	Burney.

== Vol 3 Artery-Battersea ==
Topic	Sub-Topic	Columns	Contributor/Notes
Attacco	-	0.6	Burney. With example of notation.
Aubade	-	0.1	Burney.
Bacchanalia	-	0.3	Burney. See Burney's History, Mercer's ed.
Bagpipe	-	0.5	Burney. See Burney's History, Mercer's ed
Balalaika	-	0.2	Burney.
Balet de la Royne	-	0.1	Burney. See Burney's History, vol 2, p 224ff. of Mercer's ed.
Ballad	-	0.8	Burney. See Burney's History, Mercer's ed.
Ballet	-	2.0	Burney. See Burney's History, Mercer's ed . Cross-referenced to Dance and Pantomime
Bar	Bar, in music	0.3	Burney. See Burney's History, Mercer's ed. With example of notation.
Barbiton	-	0.5	Burney.
Barcarolla	-	0.6	Burney.
Bards	-	7.0	Burney. See Burney's History, Mercer's ed . Cross referenced to Scandinavia and Armorica.
Barypycni	-	0.2	Burney. Cross-referenced to Greek System
Base	Base, in music	0.7	Burney. Cross-referenced to Counterpoint, Composition, Score, Common chords, and Thorough-Base
Base	Basse Fundamentale	4.5	Burney. With examples of notation. Cross-referenced to Terza Suona
Base	Base-Viol	1.2	Burney. See Burney's History, Mercer's ed. Cross-referenced to Fantasia, Sonata, and Concerto
Basse	Basse de Flute Traverse	0.1	Burney. See Burney's History, Mercer's ed.
Basse	Basse Flute	0.1	Burney. See Burney's History, Mercer's ed . Cross-referenced to Flute
Basse	Basse Tonique	0.1	Burney. Cross-referenced to Terza Suona
Basso Continuo	-	1.0	Burney.
Basso	Basso Stretto	0.1	Burney. Cross-referenced to Ground, Ciacona and Chaconne
Basso	BASSO Cantate	2 lines	Burney.
Bassoon	-	0.5	Burney. With example of notation. Cross-referenced to Reed and Bezozzi
Batillus	-	0.1	Burney.
Baton	-	0.1	Burney. With example of notation. Cross-referenced to Breve, Time-Table and Rests
Batterie	-	0.2	Burney.

== Vol 4 Battery-Bookbinding ==
Topic	Sub-Topic	Columns	Contributor/Notes
Battre le Mesure	-	0.5	Burney. Cross-referenced to Rhythm, Greek Music, Time, Measure, Arsis & Thesis, Bar, Accent, and Battuta.
Battuta	-	0.7	Burney. With examples of notation. Cross-referenced to Time, Accent, Arsis and Measure.
Beat in Music	-	0.2	Burney. With example of notation.
Beats	Beats, in music	0.4	Burney. Cross-referenced to Vibration, Temperament, and Tuning.
Been	-	1.0	Burney. With example of notation. An Indian fretted instrument like a guitar. Refers to plate.
Bell	-	5.6	Burney. Cross-referenced to Changes, Tintinnalogia, Carillons, and Ring.
Binding	Binding notes	0.6	Burney. With example of notation. Cross-referenced to Ligature and Syncopation.
Bis	-	0.2	Burney. With example of notation. Term meaning to perform twice.
Biscroma	-	0.1	Burney. With example of notation Cross-referenced to Timetable.
Boblsatio	-	0.1	Burney. Meaning to replace the musical terms ut, ne, mi, fa, sol, la by bo, ce, di, ga, la, ma, ni.
Bon	-	0.2	Burney. French and Italian (Bueno) term to express the accented parts of the bar

== Vol 5 Book-keeping-Calvart ==
Topic	Sub-Topic	Columns	Contributor/Notes
Boutade	-	0.1	Burney.
Bow	Bow, in music	0.2	Burney. See Burney's History, Mercer's ed .
Breve	Breve, in music	0.2	Burney. Cross-referenced to Characters of music, Semibreve, Time-Table and Notation.
Bridge	Bridge, in music	3 lines	Burney.
Broderies	-	0.4	Burney.
Bruit	-	0.9	Burney. French for Noise.
Buadh-Vaill	-	0.3	Burney. An Irish trumpet from antiquity.
Buccina	-	0.6	Burney. See Burney's History, Mercer's ed.
Bugle	Bugle	2 lines	Burney.
Burden	Burden or Burthen	0.2	Burney.
C in music	-	0.5	Burney. Cross-referenced to moods, prolation, time-table, hexachord, propriety and solmisation
Cacophony	-	2 lines	Burney.
Cadence	-	1.8	Burney. With example of notation. Cross-referenced to close, modulation and Counterpoint.
Cadenza	-	0.3	Burney. With example of notation.
Caesura	Caesura in vocal music	0.5	Burney. Cross-referenced to phrase, cadence and rest
Calascione	-	0.2	Burney. See plates.
Calculation	Calculation, in music	0.5	Burney

== Vol 6 Calvary-Castra ==
Topic	Sub-Topic	Columns	Contributor/Notes
Cambro-British music	-	0.2	Burney. See also article on Welsh music in Vol 39, Addendum,
Campanologia	-	2 lines	Burney.
Canarie	-	0.3	Burney. With example of notation.
Canon	Canon, in music	3.1	Burney. See Burney's History, Mercer's ed. Cross referenced to Valentini, Michele, Rocco Rodio and Bevin
Cantare	-	3.0	Burney. Italian for to sing. Cross-referenced to Tenducci.
Cantata	-	2.2	Burney. See Burney's History, Mercer's ed. Cross-referenced to Caccini
Canticle	-	0.2	Burney. after Roussseu.
Canto	Canto, in music	0.1	Burney.
Canzonetta	-	2 lines	Burney.
Caoinan	-	1.3	Burney. Cross-referenced to Antiphony
Capo-Tasto	-	0.1	Burney.
Capriccio	-	0.1	Burney.
Carillons	-	0.3	Burney.
Carillonneur	-	0.1	Burney.
Carnival	-	0.3	Burney?
Carola	-	0.3	Burney. See Burney's History, Mercer's ed. Cross-referenced to Ballad
Castanets	-	0.4	Burney. Translated from the Encyclopédie Méthodique

== Vol 7 Castramentation-Chronology ==
Topic	Sub-Topic	Columns	Contributor/Notes
Castrato	-	0.5	Burney. See Burney's History, Mercer's ed. Cross-referenced to Eunuch.
Catch	-	1.3	Burney.
Cathedral Service	-	8.0	Burney. See Burney's History, Mercer's ed. With examples of notation (Marbek's service).
Caudatus	-	0.1	Burney.
Centonare	-	0.1	Burney. Italian term for a musical plagiarist. Cross-referenced to Pasticcio
Chaconne	-	0.2	Burney.
Chamber	Chamber music	4 lines	Burney. See Burney's History, Mercer's ed. Cross-referenced to Musica di Camera
Chanson	-	0.8	Burney.
Chanson de Gestes	-	0.3	Burney.
Chansonette	-	2 lines	Burney.
Chant	-	0.6	Burney. Various definitions. Cathedral, Ambrosian, Gregorian, Chant sur le Livre, etc. Cross-referenced to Discant. Contrapunto alla monte or Ai'improviso.
Chanter	-	0.4	Burney. French for To Sing. After Rousseau. Cross-referenced to Melody.
Chapel	Chapel Royal Establishment	1.1	Burney. See Burney's History, Mercer's ed.
Characters	Characters used, in music. [Printing]	1.7	Burney?. With examples of notation. Ref to plate.
Character	Character, in music	0.5	Burney
Charge	-	0.4	Burney Cross-referenced to Caricata
Chevrotter	-	0.3	Burney. With example of notation.
Chiarezza	-	1.2	Burney. Cross-referenced to Transparency, Melody, Modulation, Charge, and Laboured Accompaniment.
Chinese music	-	10.2	Burney. See Burney's History, Mercer's ed. Maybe originally intended for the never-written section in his History about National Music.
Chinnor	-	3 lines	Burney. A Jewish musical instrument.
Chitarone	-	1 line	Burney. A large Spanish guitar.
Chitarra	-	1 line	Burney. Italian for guitar.
Chiudendo	-	0.1	Burney. Italian for 'to conclude'.
Chiuso	-	0.1	Burney. Italian for 'closed'. Cross-referenced to Canon.
Choeur	-	0.1	Burney.
Choir	-	1.0	Burney. Includes a discussion of dancing during church services. Cross-referenced to Dancing.
Choir	Choir Music	2 lines	Burney. Cross-referenced to Chant and Choral service.
Choral	Choral Service	0.2	Burney. Cross-referenced to Cathedral Service, Choral Service and Chapel Establishment
Chord	Chord, in music	6.6	Farey sr. Mathematical account of the vibration of strings. Cross-referenced to Scale, String and Vibration; Common Chord, Fundamental Base, Accompaniment, and Thorough-base
Choreography	-	1.0	Burney. See See Burney's History, Mercer's ed. under Dancing. Cross-referenced to Dance
Chorocitharistria	-	2 lines	Burney. An accompanist of dance on the lyre or harp.
Chorus	Chorus, in music	0.9	Burney. See Burney's History, Mercer's ed. Cross-referenced to Genera and Ancient Greek Music
Chromatic	-	4.8	Burney. Includes both ancient and modern music. With example of notation After l'Encyclopaedié.

== Vol 8 Chronometer-Colliseum ==
Topic	Sub-Topic	Columns	Contributor/Notes
Chronometer	-	109.5	Burney contributed at the end 0.9 columns on the use of the chronometer, in music.
Ciaccona	-	1.5	Burney. With example of notation. Italian for Chaconne
Cithara	-	1.9	Burney. See Burney's History, Mercer's ed. Ancient harp or lute. Mentions one being on the marble statue of Handel in Vauxhall Gardens.
Citharaedist	-	1 line	Burney.
Citharistic	-	2 lines	Burney. Music played on the cithera.
Citole	-	3 lines	Burney. Species of Cittern.
Clarinet	-	0.3	Burney.
Clarino and Clarion	-	0.2	Burney. Italian for trumpet. Cross-referenced to Cornet and Trumpet.
Clavecin	-	1 line	Burney. French for harpsichord.
Clavecin	Clavecin oculaire	0.7	Burney. Concept of the Jesuit Father Castel, who posited a harpsichord that could play colours instead of sound.
Clavichord	-	0.4	Burney.
Clavitherium	-	1 line	Burney. Cross-referenced to Citole
Clavicymbalum	-	3 lines	Burney.
Clavier	-	0.1	Burney.
Claviol	-	0.4	Burney. The invention of the American, John Isaac Hawkins.
Clef	-	4.4	Burney. With examples of notation. See Burney's History, Mercer's ed. Cross-referenced to Base, Tenor and Treble
Clergy	Clergy, Corporation of the sons of the	0.7	Burney. See Burney's History Mercer's ed, ii, pp 386, 388
Close	Close, in music	0.5	Burney. Cross-referenced to Cadence, Cadenza, Counterpoint and Composition.

== Vol 9 Collision-Corne ==
Topic	Sub-Topic	Columns	Contributor/Notes
Comedy	-	6.0	Burney? See Burney's History, Mercer's ed. No clear evidence but the Style of the writing suggests it. Cross-referenced to Drama and Theatre
Comma	Comma, in music	4.4	Farey sr. Scientific article. Has section on the major and minor comma
Commemoration	Commemoration of Handel, in music	4.4	Burney. Parts copied from Burney's History, vol 2, p 893.of Mercer's ed.
Common	Common Chord, in music	2.0	Burney, with some paragraphs by Farey sr. With example of notation
Company	Company in Commerce	1 line	Not by Burney. The Musicians are No 50 in the table of precedence of the London livery companies printed here.
Compass	Compass of voices, in music	1.9	Burney. With example of notation. Cross-referenced to Accompaniment and Clef
Composer of music	-	1.7	Burney. Cross-referenced to Counterpoint, Concords, Discords, Harmony and Modulation.
Composition	Composition, in music	1.1	Burney. With example of notation. Cross-referenced to Counterpoint, Scale, Fundamental Base and Composer.
Compound	Compound stops on the organ	0.4	Burney. Cross-referenced to Cornet, Sesquialter, Mixture, Twelfth, Tierce and Larigot
Concert	-	3 lines	Burney
Concert	Concert Spirituel	0.8	Burney. See Burney's History, Mercer ed.
Concert	Concert pitch	4.8	Farey sr. With example of notation. Scientific article. Cross-referenced to Tuning Fork, Harmonics, Pipes, Theory of the Sound of, Trumpet, Chords.
Concert	Concert of Ancient Music	0.3	Burney. See Burney's History, Mercer's ed.
Concertante	-	0.3	Burney. Italian term
Concertato	-	4 lines	Burney.
Concerto	-	1.4	Burney.
Concerto	Concerto grosso	1 line	Burney.
Concerto	Concerts, public	0.7	Burney. See Burney's History, Mercer's ed.
Concord	Concord, in music	16.0	Farey sr. Scientific article. Cross referenced to Cycle
Concordant elements, in music	-	0.1	Farey sr.
Consecutive chords, in music	-	0.2	Burney. Reference to Plate IV of music.
Consequente	-	4 lines	Burney. Italian term.
Conservatorio	-	0.5	Burney. Italian term for music schools for poor children.
Consonance, in music	-	1.2	Farey sr. Scientific article.
Consonant	Consonant, in music	0.2	Burney. with example of notation. Cross-referenced to Triad
Continuato	-	4 lines	Burney. Italian term
Continuo	-	0.1	Burney
Contra	-	0.3	Burney.
Contra	CONTRA battuta	1 line	Burney. Against or out of time.
Contralto	-	0.2	Burney. Italian for counter-tenor
Contrary	Contrary motion, in music	0.1	Burney. With example of notation.
Contra-Soggetto, in music	-	3 lines	Burney. Italian term.
Contra-Tones, in German music	-	0.2	Burney. With example of musical notation. Cross reference to Tablature.
Contrast, in music	-	0.1	Burney.
Contre	Contre-dance	0.1	Burney.
Contre	Contre-sens	2 lines	Burney.
Contre	Contre-temps	0.2	Burney.

== Vol 10 Cornea-Czyrcassy ==
Topic	Sub-Topic	Columns	Contributor/Notes
Cornet	Cornet	0.6	Burney. See Burney's History, Mercer's ed. Includes an account of the Cornet organ stop.
Cornet	Cornet stop	0.3	Burney. Organ stop.
Cornicen	-	0.2	Burney. Latin for horn blower.
Corno da Cacchia	-	0.6	Burney. Italian for French Horn, with example of notation. Cross-referenced to French Horn and Russian Music
Corona	Corona	0.2	Burney. Italian for the musical typographical character for pause, an inverted semi-circle with a full point in the middle. Cross-referenced to Crown and Pause
Counter	Counter Fugue	2 lines	Burney.
Counterpoint	-	14.4	Burney. See Burney's History, Mercer's ed. With examples of notation and with references to various plates. Cross-referenced to Thorough-bafe and Basso Principal, Rhythm, Accents, Modulation, Accompaniment, Ecclesiastical Modes, Authentic, Plagal, Composition.
Counter	Counter-tenor	0.1	Burney. Cross-referenced to Contralto
Country-Dance	-	0.1	Burney? Cross-referenced to Contre-dance
Coup	Coup de langue, in music	4 lines	Burney.
Coup	Coup d'Archet	1 line	Burney
Coup	Coup de Grace in French music	2 lines	Burney
Couper	-	0.1	Burney. French for to cut.
Criticism	Criticism, musical	3.8	Burney.
Croma	-	0.1	Burney. Italian for quaver. With example of notation.Cross referenced to Crotchet and Time-Table.
Cromatic French horns	-	0.2	Burney. Mentions instrument made by Samuel Clagget.
Cromorne	-	0.2	Burney. French for a reed stop on the organ.
Crook	Crook, [in music]	0.1	Burney. Metal tube for tuning brass instruments.
Crotalo	-	0.1	Burney. Percussion instrument.
Crotalum	-	0.3	Burney. Percussion instrument of antiquity.
Crotchet	Crotchet, in music	0.2	Burney.
Crown	Crown, in music	2 lines	Burney. The musical typographical character for pause.
Crowth	-	0.3	Burney. See Burney's History, Mercer's ed. vol 1 p588 note. A Welsh stringed instrument, played with a bow. Reference to a plate.
Cycinnis	-	4 lines	Burney. A dance performed in Greek antiquity.
Cymbal	-	1.0	Burney. See Burney's History, Mercer's ed. Cross-referenced to Corybantes

== Vol 11 D-Dissimilitude ==
Topic	Sub-Topic	Columns	Contributor/Notes
D, in English music	-	0.2	Burney.
Da capo	-	0.6	Burney. See Burney's History, Mercer's ed. Italian for return to the beginning
Dactylic [music]	-	0.1	Burney. With example of notation
Dafne	DAFNE, in music	0.1	Burney. One of the first Italian operas.
Dance	-	6.9	Burney. See Burney's History, Mercer's ed.
Dancer, Rope	-	0.7	Burney?
Danceries	-	0.2	Burney. French for country dance-tunes.
Degree	Degrees, in music	0.7	Farey sr. Scientific article. See Burney's History, Mercer's ed. Cross-referenced to Interval and Concord
Degree	Degree in universities	2.6	Burney. 2 columns of this by Burney relate to Music Degrees
Demi	Demi in French music	0.1	Burney. With example of notation.
Design	Design, in music	0.6	Burney.
Diacommatic	-	0.1	Farey sr. Scientific article. After Callcott.
Dialogue	Dialogue, in music	6 lines	Burney.
Diapason	Diapason in Ancient Music	0.4	Farey sr. Scientific article. Cross-referenced to Organ.
Diapason	Diapason stop	0.2	Burney.
Diapason	Diapason among musical instrument makers	0.3	Farey sr.? A makers' measuring Scale.
Diapson	Diapason-diaex	0.1	Farey sr. Scientific article. Cross-referenced to Concord
Diapson	Diapason-diapente	0.1	Farey sr. Scientific article. Cross-referenced to Concord
Diapson	Diapason-diatessaron	0.1	Farey sr. Scientific article. Cross referenced to Concord
Diapson	Diapason-ditone	3 lines	Farey sr. Scientific article. Cross-referenced to Concord
Diapson	Diapason semi-tone	3 lines	Farey sr. Scientific article. Cross-referenced to Concord
Diapente	-	5 lines	Farey sr. Scientific article. Cross-referenced to Fifth
Diaphonia in ancient music	-	0.1	Burney. See Burney's History, Mercer's ed.
Diatonic	-	0.2	Burney
Diatonico-Genere	-	0.2	Burney. With example of notation.
Diatonium	-	4 lines	Farey sr. Scientific article. Cross-referenced to Diatonic
Diazeutic Tone	-	2 lines	Farey sr. Scientific article.
Diazeuxis	-	0.3	Burney.
Dictionary	-	1.1	See Burney's History, Mercer's ed. The article concludes with a section by Burney on early musical dictionaries, 0.4 columns long. Cross-referenced to Didymus, Ptolemy, Tinctor and Diatonic.
Diemeris	-	0.1	Burney. Cross-referenced to Phorbaea
Diesis	Diesis in the ancient music	1.0	See Burney's History, Mercer's ed. Burney. With example of notation.
Diesis	Diesis enharmonic, in music	0.4	Farey sr. Scientific article.
Diesis	Diesis Major of Maxwell	2 lines	Farey sr. Scientific article. Cross-referenced to Comma
Diesis	Diesis Minor of Maxwell	2 lines	Farey sr. Scientific article. Cross-referenced to Schisma
Diesis	Diesis Major of Lord Brounker	2 lines	Farey sr. Scientific article.
Diesis	Diesis Chromatic	0.2	Farey sr. Scientific article.
Diesis	Diesis of Dr Smith	0.1	Farey sr. Scientific article.
Diesis	Diesis quadrantalis of Euclid	2 lines	Farey sr. Scientific article.
Diesis	Diesis trientalis of Euclid	2 lines	Farey sr. Scientific article.
Diesis	Diesis of Boethius	2 lines	Farey sr. Scientific article.
Diesis	Diesis of Mercator	2 lines	Farey sr. Scientific article.
Diesis	Diesis quadrilateral of Aristoxenus	2 lines	Farey sr. Scientific article.
Diesis	Diesis triental of Aristoxenus	2 lines	Farey sr. Scientific article.
Diesis	Diesis of Martinanus Capella	5 lines	Farey sr. Scientific article.
Dieze	Dieze maxime of Rameau	3 lines	Farey sr. Scientific article.
Dieze	Dieze major of Rameau	3 lines	Farey sr. Scientific article.
Dieze	Dieze minor of Rameau	2 lines	Farey sr. Scientific article.
Dieze	Duieze minime of Rameau	0.2	Farey sr. Scientific article.
Diff	-	0.1	Burney. An Arabian musical instrument akin to a tambourine.
Diminished	Diminished Interval, in music	1 line	Farey sr. Scientific article. Cross-referenced to Interval
Diminished	Diminished second	2 lines	Farey sr. Scientific article. Cross-referenced to Interval and Second
Diminished	Diminished third	0.2	Farey sr. Scientific article. Cross-referenced to Interval
Diminished	Diminished fourth	4 lines	Farey sr. Scientific article. Cross-referenced to Interval
Diminished	Diminished fifth	5 lines	Farey sr. Scientific article. Cross-referenced to Interval
Diminished	Diminished sixth	0.2	Farey sr. Scientific article. Cross-referenced to Temperament
Diminished	Diminished seventh	0.1	Farey sr. Scientific article. Cross-referenced to Interval
Diminished	Diminished octave	3 lines	Farey sr. Scientific article. Cross-referenced to Interval
Diminue	-	3 lines	Farey sr. Scientific article. A French term for an extreme flat 7th.
Diminuito	-	3 lines	Burney. An Italian term for out of tune
Diminution	Diminution in old music	3 lines	Burney.
Diminutione	-	4 lines	Burney. Cross-referenced to Diminutio.
Diritta	-	0.1	Burney. An Italian term. After Brossard.
Discant	-	0.8	Burney. See Burney's History, Mercer's ed.
Discord	-	2.3	Burney. See Burney's History, Mercer's ed. References to some of the musical plates on Counterpoint, nos XIV, XV, XVI. Cross-referenced to Counterpoint
Discretione	-	3 lines	Burney. An Italian term, meaning with discretion.
Disdiapason	Disdiapason, in music	0.2	Farey sr. Scientific article.
Disdiapason	Disdiapason-diaponte	2 lines	Farey sr. Scientific article.
Disdiapason	Disdiapason-diatessaron	2 lines	Farey sr. Scientific article.
Disdiapason	Disdiapason-ditone	2 lines	Farey sr. Scientific article.
Disdiapason	Disdiapason-semititone	2 lines	Farey sr. Scientific article.

== Vol 12 Dissimulation-Eloane ==
Topic	Sub-Topic	Columns	Contributor/Notes
Dissonance	-	0.4	Farey sr. Scientific article. Cross-referenced to Discord, Harmonics, Basse fondamentale'
Dissonant	Dissonant triad	4 lines	Farey sr. Scientific article. Based on Calcutt.
Distension	Distension in ancient music	0.3	Burney
Ditone	-	0.3	Farey sr. Scientific article. With example of notation. After Calcut. Cross-referenced to Interval, Tone, Septave and Finger-Key
Ditone	Ditone, greatest	4 lines	Farey sr. Scientific article.
Ditone	Ditone, least	3 lines	Farey sr. Scientific article.
Ditonico	-	0.2	Farey sr. Scientific article. After Smith.
Division	Division, in music	0.2	Burney. See Burney's History, Mercer's ed. Cross-referenced to Monochord.
Division	Division in melody	0.3	Burney.
Dixieme	-	2 lines	Burney.
Dxneuvieme	-	2 lines	Burney.
Disxseptieme	-	0.1	Burney. Cross-referenced to Sound, Interval and Harmony
Do	-	4 lines	Burney.
Doctor	Doctor, in music	1 line	Burney. See Burney's History, Mercer's ed. Cross-referenced to Academical Degrees.
Dodecachordon	-	0.2	Burney.
Doigter	-	0.2	Burney. French term for fingering a keyboard. Cross-referenced to Fingering.
Dorian	-	0.3	Burney. Cross-referenced to Modes and Canto Fermo.
Doric	Doric, in music	0.3	Burney.
Double	Double	4 lines	Burney. French term for variation.
Double	Double	0.2	Burney. French term for the understudy in theatrical or operatic performances.
Double	Double bass	4 lines	Burney.
Double	Double Chorde	0.2	Burney. French term for special fingering of the strings of the violin.
Double	Double Counterpoint	2 lines	Burney. Cross-referenced to Composition and Counterpoint.
Double	Double Croche	2 lines	Burney, French term for a semi-quaver.
Double	Double Chrochet	3 lines	Burney. French term for quaver. Cross-referenced to Abbreviation.
Double	Double Deficient Intervals	3 lines	Farey sr. Scientific article. Cross-referenced to Third, Fifth, Etc.
Double	Double Descant	1 line	Burney. Cross-referenced to Descant.
Double	Double Diesis	1 line	Burney. Cross reference to Diesis.
Double	Double Emploi	0.3	Burney. With example of notation.
Double	Double Fugue	0.3	Burney.
Double	Double Sharp	0.2	Burney
Double	Double tonguing the German flute	0.1	Burney.
Doublette	-	2 lines	Burney. The principal stop on a French organ.
Doux	Doux	0.2	Burney. French for soft.
Douxieme	-	0.1	Farey, sr. Scientific article
Douzeave	-	0.1	Farey sr. Scientific article. Cross-referenced to Temperament.
Dragon Of Wantley	-	0.5	Burney. Account of the burlesque opera by Carey and Lampe.
Dramatic	Dramatic Machinery	10.3	Some paragraphs on the history by Burney and the detailed account of the machinery by Peter Nicholson who wrote the architecture articles in Rees and Farey jr. Keyed to the plates.
Dramatic	Dramatic Music of the Greeks	0.9	Burney. Copied from Burney's History, Vol 1, pp 133–134 of Mercer's ed.
Dramatic	Dramatic Music of the Romans	0.4	Burney. Based on Burney's History, Vol 2, p 369 of Mercer's ed.
Dramatic	Dramatic music [in England]	3.4	Burney. Copied from Burney's History, Vol 2, pp 639–643 of Mercer's ed.
Dramaturgia	-	0.1	Burney. Cross-referenced to Leo Allatius.
Driving notes in music	-	5 lines	Burney. Cross-referenced to BINDING-Notes. Syncopation and Ligature.
Drone-Base	-	0.1	Burney. Part of the Bag-Pipe.
Drum	-	4.4	Burney. See Burney's History, Mercer's ed. Largely concerns the drum in the military.
Due Chori	-	0.9	Burney. Italian term for a double choir or chorus.
Duet	-	2.7	Burney. Cross-referenced to Unity of Melody
Duet	Duetti da Camera	5 lines	Burney.
Duet	Duettini	2 lines	Burney. Italian for a little duet.
Dulciana	-	0.1	Burney. An organ stop.
Dulcimer	-	0.2	Burney.
Dulcino	-	4 lines	Burney. After Brossard. Seems to be a small bassoon
Duo	-	0.1	Burney. Cross-referenced to Duet
Durade	-	3 lines	Burney. Italian for harsh or sharp
Durum	-	0.2	Burney. Latin for hardness or sharp. Applied to the Hexachord.
Echeia	-	0.1	Burney. Acoustic vases. Copied from Burney's History, Vol 1, pp 135–136 of Mercer's ed.
Echelle	-	0.5	Burney. See Burney's History, Mercer's ed. under Scale. French for Scale. With example of notation.
Echo	Echo, IN Music	0.1	Burney.
Echometer, in music	-	0.2	Burney. Note about a French measuring gauge for the duration of sound.
Ecmeles	-	5 lines	Burney. A Greek term for a type of sound.
Effect	Effect, in music	0.8	Burney. See Burney's History, Mercer's ed.
Eighth	Eighth, in music	0.2	Burney. Cross-referenced to Octave
Ellipsis	Ellipsis in music	0.1	Burney. A broken musical passage, with example of notation, after Walther.

== Vol 13 Elocution-Extremities ==
Topic	Sub-Topic	Columns	Contributor/Notes
Enharmonic genus, in Ancient Greek Music	-	1.2	Farey Sr. Scientific article. With example of notation. Cross-referenced to Ancient Greek Music, Genera, TetrachordS, Tone, Semi-tone, Enharmonis Sharps or Dieses
Enharmonic Diesis	-	2 lines	Farey Sr. Scientific article. Cross-referenced to Enharmonic Diesis.
Enharmonic Degree of Aristoxinus	-	3 lines	Farey Sr. Scientific article.
Enharmonic Degree of Euclid	-	3 lines	Farey Sr. Scientific article.
Enharmonic Ditone of Euclid	-	2 lines	Farey Sr. Scientific article.
Enharmonic Quarter of a tone	-	2 lines	Farey Sr. Scientific article.
Enneachord	-	2 lines	Burney. 9 string instrument of Antiquity.
Entracte	-	1.6	Burney. Cross-referenced to Opera
Eptamerides	-	0.2	Farey Sr. Scientific article. An Interval of music. Cross-referenced to Decameride.
Equal Beating	-	1.1	Farey Sr. Scientific article. Cross-referenced to Biequal Third.
Equal Harmony	-	0.7	Farey Sr. Scientific article. Cross-referenced to Temperament and Triple Progression.
Equal Temperamant	-	0.8	Farey Sr. Scientific article. Crfoss-referenced to Temperament.
Equisonance	-	0.1	Burney
Eschaton	-	0.3	Farey Sr. Scientific article. Cross-referenced to Interval.
Excessive in Music	-	0.2	Farey sr. Scientific article
Execution	Execution in Musical Performance	0.8	Burney.
Expression	Expression in Music	3.5	Burney. After Rousseau
Extemporaneous	Extemporaneous playing	0.2	Burney. Burney
Extension in Ancient Music	-	0.1	Burney

== Vol 14 Extrinsic-Food (part) ==
Topic	Sub-Topic	Columns	Contributor/Notes
Faburden	-	0.7	Burney. See Faux-bourdon in Burney's History, Mercer's ed. Cross-referenced to Falso-bordone
Facteur	-	0.3	Burney. French for a maker. Burney discusses musical instrument makers.
Fagotto	-	0.1	Burney. Italian term for the Bassoon.
FALL	-	One line	Burney. Cross-referenced to Cadence.
Falset from Falsetto	-	0.2	Burney.
Falso-Bordone	-	0.3	Burney. Includes notation.
Fandango	-	0.5	Burney.
Fanfare	-	0.3	Burney.
Fantasia	-	2.1	Burney. See Fantasia for instruments in Burney's History, Mercer's ed.
Favorito	-	0.1	Burney
Fausse	-	0.2	Burney. French for false, or out of tune.
Fausset	-	0.1	Burney.French for a voice that sings falsetto. Cross-referenced to Octave and Falset
Faux	-	One line	Burney. Cross-referenced to Fausse
Faux	Faux-bourdon	2 lines	Burney. Cross-referenced to Falso-bordone and Faburden.
Feinte	-	0.3	Burney. A French term. It was once used for the chromatic keys on a keyboard.
Female flute player	-	2 lines	Burney. See Burney's History, Mercer's ed. Cross-referenced to Flute, Lamia and Ambubajae.
Fermo, or Canto Fermo	-	0.5	Burney. Italian for Plain Chant. Cross-referenced to Plain Chant, Ambrosian Chant and Gregorian Notes.
Fete	-	0.1	Burney. Cross-referenced to Ballet.
Fiato	-	0.1	Burney.
Fiddle	-	0.3	Burney. See Burney's History, Mercer's ed. Cross-referenced to Violin, Rebec and Bow.
Fife	-	0.7	Burney.
Fifer	-	0.5	Burney. Includes comment about the Fifers being used to undertake military floggings.
Fifteenth in Music	-	3 lines	Farey Sr. Scientific article. Cross-referenced to Concords.
Fifteenth stop	-	0.1	Burney. Organ stop.
Fifth	-	3.4	Farey Sr. Scientific article. Cross-referenced to Monochord and Fundamental Base.
Figure	Figure in music	0.2	Burney. Cross-referenced to Time-table.
Figure	Figure, mute	2 lines	Burney. In Italian music, a sign imply a rest or silence.
Figured	Figured in music	0.1	Burney. Cross-referenced to chords, Thorough Base and Accompaniment.
Filer un son	-	0.3	Burney. French. To draw out a sound.
Finale	-	0.3	Burney.
Fingers	Finger-keys in music	0.3	Burney. Cross-referenced to Temperament
Fingers	Finger-keys Intervals	0.3	Farey Sr. Scientific article. Cross-referenced to Fifth
Fingers	Finger-keyed viol	2.1	Farey Jr. See Claviole. Description the instrument made by John Isaac Hawkins and illustrated at Plate XIV of Miscellany.
Fingering on keyed instruments	-	2.1	Burney. Cross-referenced to Doighter
Finito	-	0.1	Burney. Italian for to finish as applied to a Canon. Cross-referenced to Canon.
Flageolet	-	0.2	Burney.
FLAT	-	0.5	Burney. Cross-referenced to Scales, Characters and Transpositions.
Flat	Flat Third	1 line	Burney. Cross referenced to Minor third.
Flat	Flat Key	1 line	Burney. Cross referenced to Minor third.
Flat	Flat Double	1.4	Farey Sr. Scientific article. Cross-referenced to FLAT, Equal Temperament, FINGer-key Intervals, Limma, and Sharp.
Flute	-	5.9	Burney. See Burney's History, Mercer's ed. Cross-referenced to Perfect instruments.
Flute	Flute Travesiere	1 line	Burney. Italian for horizontal flute.
Flute	Flute Allemande, or German Flute	2.0	Burney. See Burney's History, Mercer's ed.
Flute	Flute stop on an Organ	5 lines	Burney.
Flutter	-	0.2	Farey Sr. Scientific article. Cross-referenced to Concord
Folies	-	0.2	Burney. A type of dance.
Fondamentale	-	6.4	Burney. With example of notation. Cross-referenced to Basse Fondimentale
Fondaments	-	0.1	Burney. Cross-referenced to Basse Fondimentale

== Vol 15 Food(part)-Generation (part) ==
Topic	Sub-Topic	Columns	Contributor/Notes
Force	Force in music	0.2	Burney, quoting Rousseau.
Forlana	-	0.2	Burney. An Italian dance.
Fort	Fort	2 lines	Burney. French for Loud. Cross-referenced to Accent, Tact and Trine.
Fortamente	-	2 lines	Burney. An Italian term for Loud.
Forte	-	0.1	Burney. Italian for loud.
Forte-piano	-	0.2	Burney. Cross-referenced to Piano-Forte and Harpsichord.
Fourteenth	-	0.2	Farey Sr. Scientific article. According to Farey it is the octave of a seventh.
Fourth	-	2.5	Farey Sr. Scientific article. Includes details of variants of Fourth. e.g. Fourth Flat and Fourth Sharp.
Fragmens	-	0.4	Burney. In Italian a Pastiche.
Frappe	-	0.3	Burney. French term used in the conducting of music. Cross-referenced to Theses.
Fredon	-	0.1	Burney. A shorter version of a Roulade
Fuga	-	0.9	Burney. Cross-referenced to Counterpoint, Authentic, Plagal, Prolation, Augmentation, and Diminution.
Fughe	-	0.5	Burney. Plural of Fuga. Cross-referenced to Double Counterpoint.
Fugue	-	0.2	Burney. See Burney's History, Mercer's ed Cross-referenced to Fuga.
Fundamental	-	4 lines	Burney.
Fundamental	Bass	2 lines	Burney. Cross-referenced to Basse Fondamentale and Fondamentale.
Fundamental	Concords	0.3	Farey Sr. Scientific article. Cros-referenced to Concord.
G	-	0.3	Farey Sr. Scientific article, with example of notation. Cross-referenced to Hexachord.
Gagliarda	-	0.2	Burney. A Renaissance dance. Cross-referenced to Pavana and Parthenia
Galileo's Temperament of the Musical Scale	-	0.2	Farey Sr. Scientific article.
Galliard	-	0.2	Burney.
Games, musical in the Greek Antiquity	-	7.2	Burney. Cross-referenced to Rhapsodist.
Gamme	-	1.6	Burney. Includes example of notation. See Burney's History vol 1 p 467ff in Mercer's ed. Cross-referenced to Harmonic Hand, Solmisation, Hexachords, Hymn. Guido and Micrologus
Gavotta	-	0.3	Burney.
Gavotta, Tempo da	-	4 lines	Burney.
Gayment	-	0.1	Burney. French term, equivalent to Allegro.
Genera in Ancient Greek Music	-	1.6	Burney. See Burney's History, Mercer's ed. Includes examples of notation.
Generate	-	0.3	Burney. Cross-referenced to Generator

== Vol 16 Generation (part)- Gretna ==
Topic	Sub-Topic	Columns	Contributor/Notes
Generator	-	0.3	Burney. Cross-referenced to Generate
Genius	Genius [in music]	0.2	Burney. Citing Rousseau.
German	German School of Music	1.3	Burney. See Burney's History of Mercer's ed.
Giga	-	0.2	Burney. Italian for Gigue
Gigg	-	One line	Burney. Cross-referenced to Giga
Gingros	-	0.1	Burney. A type of flute used in antiquity.
Glee	-	0.4	Burney. See Burney's History vol 2 pp 375–376 of Mercer's ed.
Gong	-	0.3	Burney
Gongong	-	0.5	Burney. An African musical instrument. Refers to fig 3 of Plate II and Fig 9 of Plate III of Musical Instruments
Gothic	Gothic Music	0.2	Burney. Citing Eximeno
Grave in music	-	0.3	Farey sr. Scientific article. Cross-referenced to Gravity in Music
Grave	Grave Harmonic in music	4.6	Farey Sr. Scientific article. Cross-referenced to Beats
Grave	Grave Intervals	0.2	Farey Sr. Scientific article. Cross-referenced to Major Comma, Comma deficient Intervals
Grave	Grave fourth	0.1	Farey Sr. Scientific article.
Grave	Grave proper semitone	5 lines	Farey Sr. Scientific article.
Gravity	Gravity in music	1.1	Farey sr. Scientific article. Cross-referenced to chord, String in Music, Harmonics and Ratio
Grazioso	-	0.2	Burney. Italian for gracefully.
Great	Great Intervals in Music	4 lines	Farey Sr. Scientific article. Cross-referenced to Greater
Great	Great Octave in Music	0.1	Farey Sr. Scientific article. Cross-referenced to Small Octave, Once-marked Octave and Twice-marked Octave
Great	Great Scale in Music	0.3	Farey Sr. Scientific article. Cross-referenced to Greek Scale
Great	Great Sixth, Redundant, in Music	0.1	Farey Sr. Scientific article.
Great	Great third, in Music	0.2	Farey Sr. Scientific article. Cross-referenced to Equal Beating
Greater	Greater Enharmonical Diesis	1 line	Farey Sr. Scientific article. Cross-referenced to Diesis
Greater	Greater Hexachord	1 line	Farey Sr. Scientific article. Cross-referenced to Hexachord
Greater	Greater in music	0.2	Farey Sr. Scientific article.
Greek Church, Music of the	-	4.7	Burney.
Greek Music, Ancient	-	8.6	Burney. See Burney's History of Mercer's ed. With examples of notation.
Gregorian chant	-	1 line	Burney. Cross referenced to Chant
Gregorian Notes in Ecclesiastical Music	-	0.3	Burney.

== Vol 17 Gretry-Hebe ==
Topic	Sub-Topic	Columns	Contributor/Notes
Ground	Ground Base in Music	0.1	Burney. Cross-referenced to Stradella and Purcell
Gruppo, or Shake	-	0.1	Burney.
Guitarra	-	3.1	Burney. See Burney's History vol 2, p 145. Includes example of notation.
Haerlem	-	1.1	Half the article is an account by Burney of the organ there. See Burney's Travels, Scholes's ed under Haarlem.
Half-Note in Music	-	0.1	Farey, Sr. Scientific article.
Half-Note	-	0.2	Farey, Sr. Scientific article. Cross-referenced to Temperament
Half-Note	Half-note, Greater	3 lines	Farey, Sr. Scientific article.
Half-Note	Half-note, Lesser	2 lines	Farey, Sr. Scientific article.
Half-tone in Music	-	3 lines	Farey, Sr. Scientific article.
Half-tone	Half-Tone, Hemitone	0.1	Farey, Sr. Scientific article.
Half-Tone	Half-Tone, Mean	0.1	Farey, Sr. Scientific article. Cross-referenced to Note and Tone
HamburgH	-	3.4	The last 0.8 column is by Burney on the musical life of the city. See Vol 2 of Scholes's ed of Burney's Musical Tours Cross-referenced to Graun
Hand, Harmonical in Music	-	0.5	Burney. With reference to a plate. Cross-referenced to HexachordS, Solmisation and D'avilla
Harmatian, or Chariot Air	-	0.1	Burney. See Burney's History, Vol 1, p 309 of Mercer's ed.
Harmonia	-	3 lines	Burney.
Harmoniae	-	3 lines	Farey, Sr. Scientific article.
Harmonica	-	3 lines	Burney. Cross-referenced to Harmonics
Harmonica	Harmonica Regula	1.5	Burney. Cross-referenced to Monochord, Vibrations, Sons Harmoniques, Pythagorus, Euclid
Harmonic Elements	-	0.3	Farey, Sr. Scientific article. Cross-referenced to Concord
Harmonic genus	-	3 lines	Burney. Cross-referenced to Enharmonic
Harmonic	Harmonic Sliders	0.6	Farey, Jr. Technical article. Description of Dr Thomas Young's machine for demonstrating harmonic motion.
Harmonical	-	3 lines	Burney.
Harmonical	Harmonical arithmatic	0.1	Farey, Sr. Scientific article.
Harmonical	Harmonical Composition	0.3	Burney.
Harmonical Sounds	-	2 lines	Burney. Cross-referenced to Son and Sound
Harmonics	-	0.1	Farey, Sr. Scientific article.
Harmonics	Harmonics, Experiments in	1.8	Farey, Sr. Scientific article. Includes examples of notation. Cross-referenced to Note-Flute and Generator
Harmonics	Harmonics, Acute	1.3	Farey, Sr. Scientific article. Cross-referenced to Concord, and Finger-keyed Viol.
Harmonics	Harmonics, Grave	0.3	Farey, Sr. Scientific article. Cross-referenced to Beats and Grave Harmonic.
Harmonicus, Canon	-	1 line	Farey, Sr. Cross reference to Monochord.
Harmonie Direct	-	0.1	Burney. Cross-referenced to Direct and Inverted.
Harmonist	-	0.2	Burney. A musician learned in Harmony.
Harmonometre	-	0.2	Farey, Sr. Scientific article. Cross-referenced to Monochord
Harmony	-	1.9	Burney, translated from Rousseau.
Harmony	Harmony, figurative	0.1	Burney. Cross-referenced to Gregorian and Fugurative
Harmony	Harmony, Perfect, of Maxwell	0.2	Farey, Sr. Scientific article. Cross-referenced to Maxwell's Scale of Intervals.
Harmony	Harmony, Equal of Dr Smith	0.6	Farey, Sr. Scientific article.
Harmony	Harmony, Temperaments of	0.3	Farey, Sr. Scientific article.
Harmony	Harmony of the Spheres	0.6	Burney. See Burney's History, Vol 1, Pp 224,337, Mercer's ed Cross-referenced to Gravity.
Harp	-	5.0	Burney. See Burney's History, Mercer's ed.
Harp	Harp, Bell	0.2	Burney. Invented by John Simcox of Bath, Somerset. See Scholes's Oxford Companion to Music, 1938, p 91.
Harp	Harp, Silver, or Prize Harp	0.2	Burney. Mentions being illustrated in a plate.
Harp	Harp, Aeolus's	1 line	Burney. Cross reference to Aeolus's Harp
Harpe	Harpe a Pedal	0.5	Burney.
Harpegement	-	1 line	Burney. Cross referenced to Arpeggio.
Harpeggiato	-	1 line	Burney. Cross referenced to Arpeggio.
Harpers, British	-	0.3	Burney.
Harpsichord	-	1.3	Burney. See Burney's History, Mercer's ed Cross-referenced to Jack, Spinet and Virginals
Harrison	Harrison's Temperamant	0.2	Farey Sr. Scientific article. The celebrated marine chronometer maker.
Haut	-	2 lines	Burney.
Haut	HAUT-dessus	1 line	Burney.
Hautbois	-	0.6	Burney. See Burney's History, Mercer's ed.
Hawkes's Temperament of the musical Scale	-	2.4	Farey. sr. Scientific article. Cross-referenced to Grave Harmonics and Concert-pitch.
Hebrew Music	-	6.7	Burney. See Burney's History, vol 1, pp 191–214 of Mercer's ed.
Hemidiapente	-	3 lines	Farey, sr. Scientific article. Cross-referenced to Flat Fifth.
Hemiditone	-	4 lines	Farey, sr. Scientific article. Cross-referenced to Minor Third.
Hemitone in Music	-	3 lines	Farey, sr. Scientific article.
Hemitone	Hemitone of Aristoxenus	0.2	Farey, sr. Scientific article.
Hemitone	Hemitone of Euclid's diatonum syntonum	0.3	Farey, sr. Scientific article.
Hemitone	Hemitone, Greater	3 lines	Farey, sr. Scientific article. Cross-referenced to Semitone Maximum of Overend.
Hemitone	Hemitone, Major	4 lines	Farey, sr. Scientific article.
Hemitone	Hemitone, Major of Boethius	0.7	Farey, sr. Scientific article. Cross-referenced to Apotome
Hemitone	Hemitone, Medium of Holder	3 lines	Farey, sr. Scientific article. Cross-referenced to Semitone Medius
Hemitone	Hemitone, Minor of Holder	3 lines	Farey, sr. Scientific article. Cross-referenced to Semitone Minor
Hemitone	Hemitone, Minor of Boethius and Sauveur	4 lines	Farey, sr. Scientific article.
Hemitone	Hemitone, Minimum of Holder	3 lines	Farey, sr. Scientific article. Cross-referenced to Semitone monimum
Hemitone	Hemitone, Artificial of Holder	0.1	Farey, sr. Scientific article.
Hemitone	Hemitone, Greater of Quintilian	0.1	Farey, sr. Scientific article.
Hemitone	Hemitone, Lesser of Quintilian	0.1	Farey, sr. Scientific article. Cross-referenced to Harmonic Sliders.
Hemitone	Hemitone, Subminimus of Mersennus, Holder, etc.	3 lines	Farey, sr. Scientific article.
Hemitone	Hemitone, Wolf	0.1	Farey, sr. Scientific article.
Heptachord	-	0.2	Farey, sr. Scientific article. Cross-referenced to Seventh and Lyre.
Heptachord	Heptachord, Major	3 lines	Farey, sr. Scientific article. Cross referenced to major Seventh
Heptachord	Heptachord, Minor	3 lines	Farey, sr. Scientific article. Cross referenced to minor Seventh
Heptachord	Heptachord, Minor of Gallileo	3 lines	Farey, sr. Scientific article. Cross referenced to minor Seventh
Heptameride	-	0.1	Farey, sr. Scientific article. Cross referenced to Decameride
Heptameris	-	0.2	Farey, sr. Scientific article.
Hermathias	-	0.2	Burney. Cross referenced to Harmatian Air and Rhythm
Hermosmenon	-	0.1	Burney.
Hexachord	-	0.3	Burney. Cross referenced to Matation, Solmisation and Harmonic Hand
Hexachord	Hexachord, Major	3 lines	Farey, sr. Scientific article. Cross referenced to Major Sixth
Hexachord	Hexachord, Major of Galileo	3 lines	Farey, sr. Scientific article. Cross referenced to comma-redundant-Major Sixth
Hexachord	Hexachord, Minor	3 lines	Farey, sr. Scientific article. Cross referenced to Minor Sixth
Hexachord	Hexachord, Minor of Galileo	3 lines	Farey, sr. Scientific article. Cross referenced to comma-redundant-Minor Sixth
Hexachord	Hexachord, Minor of Didymus	3 lines	Farey, sr. Scientific article. Cross referenced to comma-redundant- Major Sixth

== Vol 18 Hibiscus-Increment ==
Topic	Sub-Topic	Columns	Contributor/Notes
High	High in Music	3 lines	Burney.
John Holden	Holden's Temperamant of the Musical Scale	1.1	Farey, sr. Scientific article. Cross-referenced to Mr Hawke's Douzeave System and Grave Harmonics.
Hoquetus	-	0.2	Burney. See Burney's History, vol 1, p 511, n l, of Mercer's ed.
Hormus in Ancient Music	-	0.3	Burney. A Greek dance performed by boys and girls.
Horn	-	2.3	Burney. See Burney's History, Mercer's ed. There is a long section about the mathematics of the sound produced by the Horn, by Farey, sr. Mentions Claggett's double trumpet. Cross-referenced to Trumpet.
Hornpipe	-	0.6	Burney. The article briefly mentions the dance.
Hungarian	Hungarian Music	1.2	Burney, after Laborde.
Hurdy gurdy	-	1 line	Burney. Burney. See Burney's History, vol 1, p 588 of Mercer's ed. Cross-referenced to Monochord
Hydraulicon	-	0.6	Burney. See Burney's History, Mercer's ed. Mentions a modern pneumatic organ.
Hymn	-	0.5	Burney. See Burney's History, Mercer's ed. Cross-referenced to Ode and Song.
Hymn	Hymn of Castor	0.1	Burney.
Hymn	Hymn of Aristotle to Hermias	0.4	Burney.See Burney's History, vol 1, p 363 of Mercer's ed
Hymn	Hymn of Battle	0.3	Burney. Hymn sung by the Ancient Greeks as they went into battle.
Hypate	-	3 lines	Burney.
Hypate	Hypate Hypaton	2 lines	Burney. Cross-referenced to Greek Scale and Notation.
Hypate	Hypate Meson	3 lines	Burney. Cross-referenced to Conjoint.
Hypate	Hypate Prima in Music	3 lines	Farey Sr. Scientific Article. Cross-referenced to Fifth.
Hypatoide	-	1 line	Burney.
Hypatiodes	-	1 line	Burney. Cross referenced to Lepsis
Hypaton, Diatonos	-	1 line	Burney. Cross-referenced to Diatonus and System
Hyper-aeolian	-	0.2	Burney.
Hyper-diezeuxis	-	3 lines	Burney.
Hyper-dorian	-	0.1	Burney.
Hyper-ionian	-	3 Lines	Burney.
Hyper-lydian	-	3 lines	Burney.
Hyperoche of Dr Busby in music	-	0.2	Farey, sr. Scientific article.
Hyperoche	Hyperoche of Dr Callcott	0.1	Farey, sr. Scientific article. Cross-referenced to Residual.
Hyperoche	Hyperoche of Hensling	0.4	Farey, sr. Scientific article.
Hyperoche	Hyperoche of Ptolomy	0.1	Farey, sr. Scientific article. Cross-referenced to Beats.
Hypo Aeolian	-	3 Lines	Burney.
Hypo-diezeuxis	-	0.1	Burney. Cross-referenced to Tetrachord.
Hypo-dorian	-	5 lines	Burney.
Hypo-iastian	-	1 line	Burney. Cross-referenced to Hypo-ionian
Hypo-ionian	-	4 lines	Burney.
Hypo-lydian	-	0.2	Burney.
Hypo-mixo-lydian	-	4 lines	Burney.
Hypo-phrygian	-	0.2	Burney.
Hypo-proslambanomenoS	-	0.1	Burney. Cross-referenced to Diagram.
Hypo-synaphe	-	0.1	Burney.
Hyppophorbion	-	0.1	Burney. A type of flute used by the Ancient Greeks
Jack	Jack in Music	0.2	Burney.
Iambic Verse	-	0.3	Burney. The final part of this article is a section about musical instruments accompanying the declamation of verse. With example of notation.
Jeux	Jeux d'Orgues	0.3	Burney. Cross-referenced to Organ
Imitation	Imitation in Music	0.8	Burney. Cross-referenced to Harmony.
Imperfect Consonances in Music	-	0.2	Farey, sr. Scientific article.
Imperfect	Imperfect Chords	2 lines	Farey, sr. Scientific article.
Imperfect	Imperfect Instruments	0.4	Farey, sr. Scientific article. Cross-referenced to Hawke's Temperament and Perfect Instruments.
Imperfect	Imperfect Intervals	0.3	Farey, sr. Scientific article.
Improvisare	-	1 line	Burney.
Improvisatore	-	0.6	Burney.
Incomposit in Music	-	0.3	Farey, sr. Scientific article. Cross referenced in Triental Dieses, Interval
Incomposit	Incomposit of the Chromatic Seseuplum in the Greek Music	0.2	Farey, sr. Scientific article. Cross-referenced to Interval.
Incomposit	Incomposit of the Diatonic Molle	0.1	Farey, sr. Scientific article.
Incomposit	Incomposit Diatone of the Enharmonic Genus	0.1	Farey, sr. Scientific article.
Iconcinnous in Music	-	0.2	Farey, sr. Scientific article.
Inconcinnous	Inconcinnous Intervals	0.2	Farey, sr. Scientific article.
Inconsonance	-	2 lines	Burney.

== Vol 19 Increments-Kilmes ==
Topic	Sub-Topic	Columns	Contributor/Notes
Incurabili	-	0.1	See Burney's Travels, Scholes's ed.
Inharmonical Relation in Music	-	2 lines	Burney. Cross-referenced to Relation Inharmonical
Inharmonical	-	3 lines	Burney.
Inharmoneous	-	4 lines	Burney.
Instruments, Musical	-	3.2	Burney. See Burney's History, vol 1, pp 177, 386 of Mercer's ed. The conclusion (1.5 col) on modern instruments is by Farey, sr.. Liston's Enharmonic organ is described. There is a note that the latter account was written in April 1811. Cross-referenced to Theban Harp, Hawk's Temperament, Harmony, Temperaments of, Liston's Scales of Musical Intervals.
Instrument, Wind	-	1 line	Burney. Cross-reference to Wind.
Intension	-	0.1	Farey, sr. Scientific article.
Interesting	-	0.4	Burney.
Intermezzo	-	0.6	Burney. See Burney's History, Mercer's ed.
Interval in Music	-	0.2	Farey, sr. Scientific article.
Interval	Interval, Simple	4 lines	Farey, sr. Scientific article.
Interval	Interval, Compound	11.0	Farey, sr. Scientific article.
Interval	Intervals, Concinnous	0.2	Farey, sr. Scientific article. Cross-referenced to Concinnous.
Interval	Interval, Diminished	0.2	Farey, sr. Scientific article.
Interval	Interval, Harmonical	0.1	Farey, sr. Scientific article.
Invention	Invention in Music	0.4	Burney. Cross-referenced to Composition and Counterpoint.
Inversion	Inversion in Music	0.1	Farey, sr. Scientific article.
JongleurS	-	1.1	Burney. See Burney's History, Mercer's ed. Cross-referenced to Minstrel
Ionic, or Ionian mode in Music	-	5 lines	Burney. cross-referenced to Mode
Jouer des Instrumens	-	0.1	Burney. Brief discussion of the French terms used. One plays the violin etc., touches the harpsichord, and sounds the trumpet, etc.
Irregolore in Ecclesiastical music	-	0.2	Burney. Cross referenced to Cadence
Isochronous Parcels in Music	-	0.4	Farey, sr. Scientific article. Cross-referenced to Grave Harmonics and Holden's System of Musical Intervals
Isotonic Scale in Music	-	0.7	Farey, sr. Scientific article. Cross referenced to Equal Temperament
Italy	-	10.4	The article concludes with a (1.2 col) account of music in Italy by Burney.
Iule in the Music of the Ancients	-	0.1	Burney. A harvest song
Key	Key in Music	2.0	Burney.

== Vol 20 Kiln-Light ==
Topic	Sub-Topic	Columns	Contributor/Notes
King's Band in Musical History	-	0.5	Burney. See Burney's History Mercer's ed. Cross-referenced to Chapel Royal Establishment, Minstrels and Waits
King of the Minstrels in Musical History	-	0.9	Burney. See Burney's History, vol 2, p 365 of Mercer's ed. Cross-referenced to Minstrels
Kirchean Museum at Rome	-	0.2	Burney
KIT	-	0.1	Burney
Language	Language, Euphony of, for Singing	6.2	Burney. See Burney's History, vol 2, p 497-505 of Mercer's ed. Cross-referenced to Song, Symmetry and Unity of Melody.
Large	Large	4 lines	Burney. The Maxima note. Cross-referenced to Character.
Larghetto	-	1 line	Burney.
Largo	-	0.1	Burney.
Larigot	-	3 lines	Burney.
Laudi Spirituali	-	0.9	Burney. See Burney's History, Mercer's ed.
Lay	-	1.4	Burney. See Burney's History, vol 1, pp 586–588 of Mercer's ed.
Legatura	-	1.2	Burney. See Burney's History, Mercer's ed. With example of notation. Cross-referenced to Syncopation
Lemma in Ancient Music	-	2 lines	Burney. Cross-referenced to Rhythm
Lesson	Lessons for Virginal, Spinet and Harpsichord	0.9	Burney.
LibertÉ de la Musique	-	1.4	Burney, after D'Alembert's essay in Mélange de Littérateure et de Philosophie (1767)
Libitum	-	0.3	Burney.
Library	Library, Musical	1.5	Burney. See Burney's History, vol 1, pp 708–9 of Mercer's ed.
Licence	licence in Music	0.4	Burney. Where rules of Harmony might be broken.
Lichanos	-	0.1	Farey, sr. Scientific article.
Liege	-	0.8	Concludes with a paragraph (0.2) by Burney about an arts college in Rome for students from Liege. Founded by Lambert Darchis in 1696.
Ligature	Ligature, Ligatura in Italian Music	0.8	Burney. See Burney's History, vol 1, p 539-40 of Mercer's ed. With examples of notation. Cross-referenced to Character and Legatura

== Vol 21 Lighthouse-Machinery (part) ==
Topic	Sub-Topic	Columns	Contributor/Notes
Liturgy	-	5.3	See Burney's History, Mercer's ed. The conclusion.(0.6 col) is by Burney.
Lityersa	-	0.2	Burney. Song of the reaper in Ancient Greece.
Locrian in Ancient Music	-	2 lines	Burney.
Lolichmium in Greek Music	-	0.1	Burney. It was a gymnasium on Olympus where performances were held.
London	London, Places of Public Entertainment	2.0	Burney? Has an account of the theatrical and musical life, and paragraphs about individual theatres.
Longa	-	0.3	Burney. With examples of notation.
Longspiel	-	0.2	Burney. Icelandic drone-zither. Cross-referenced to Scalds.
Loure	-	0.1	Burney.
lute	-	1.7	Burney. See Burney's History, Mercer's ed.
Lydian	-	0.3	Burney.
Lydian	Lydian Lyre in Ancient Music	0.2	Burney. See Burney's History, Mercer's ed. Cross-referenced to Music of the Greeks and Notation.
Lyre	-	2.7	Burney. See Burney's History, Mercer's ed. Cross-referenced to Harp, Psaltry, Sambica, Magadis, Barbiton and Cithara.
Lyre	Lyre of the Muscovites	4 lines	Burney.
Lyric	Lyric poetry	1.1	Burney Cross-referenced to Ode and Poetry.
Lyrodi	-	4 lines	Burney. A singer who was accompanied by a lyre.
Macbeth	-	4 lines	Burney. See Burney's History, vol 2, p 645 of Mercer's ed. Concerns Mathew Locke's setting of the Witches songs. Cross-referenced to Dramatic Music.
Machinery	-	1.1	Burney. Concerns machinery in the theatre and opera.

== Vol 22 Machinery(part)-Mattheson ==
Topic	Sub-Topic	Columns	Contributor/Notes
Machul	-	0.2	Burney. Name of two types of Jewish musical instruments
Madrigal	-	0.4	Burney. See Burney's History, Mercer's ed.
Magadis	-	0.4	Burney. See Burney's History, vol 1, p 335 of Mercer's ed. Name of two types of Ancient Greek musical instruments.
Maitre à Chanter	-	0.5	Burney Cross-referenced to Cantare, Solfeggia and Expression.
Manheim	Manheim School of Music	0.9	Burney. See Burney's History, vol 2, p 945 of Mercer's ed.
March	March in Music	1.5	Burney. See Burney's Travels, Scholes's ed under Military Music.
Masque	Masque in music	1.4	Burney. See Burney's History, Mercer's ed.

== Vol 23 Matthew-Monsoon ==
Topic	Sub-Topic	Columns	Contributor/Notes
Measure	Measure in Music	0.3	Burney. Cross-referenced to Time.
Measure	Measures, Musical	0.4	Burney. See Burney's History, Mercer's ed. Cross-referenced to Arsis and Thesis.
Medicina Musica	-	1.1	Burney. See Burney's History, vol 1, p 156ff of Mercer's ed. A review of a book by Richard Browne of Oakham, Rutlandshire
Medley	Medley in Music	0.2	Burney.
Melodia	-	1.5	Burney. See Burney's History, Mercer's ed. Cross-referenced to Accent, Bar and Chinese Music.
Melodieux	-	0.1	Burney.
Melo-drama	-	0.7	Burney.
Melopoeia	-	1.9	Burney. See Burney's History, vol 1, p 67ff of Mercer's ed. With examples of notation. Cross-referenced to Music of the Greeks.
Melos	Melos and Melodias	0.2	Burney. cross-referenced to Melopoeia.
Mendicanti	-	0.4	Burney. See Burney's Travels, Scholes's ed. A girls' music school at Venice. Burney was shown round by Ferdinando Bertoni the director.
Menestral	-	0.3	Burney.
Menuet	-	0.4	Burney.
Mesochoros	-	0.1	Burney. Choirmaster in Antiquity.
Meson	-	0.1	Burney. Refers to one of the plates.
Metrometer	-	0.2	Burney. A Metronome.
Mezza Pausa	-	3 lines	Burney. Cross-referenced to Pause.
Mezzo	-	0.1	Burney. Cross referenced to Clefs and Compass of Voices
Mi Contra Fa in Counterpoint	-	0.3	Burney.
MicrophoneS	-	2 lines	Burney?
Milieu Harmonique in French Music	-	4 lines	Burney.
Military	Military Music	0.5	Burney, after Francis Grose Military Antiquities 1788. See Burney's History, Mercer's ed. and see Burney's Travels, Scholes's ed
Minim in Music	-	0.2	Burney. Includes example of notation. Cross-referenced to Musica Mensurabilis, Time, Measure and Musical Characters.
Minnin	-	0.1	Burney, after Hawkins, History of Music, vol 1. A Jewish stringed instrument resembling the viol. After Hawkins.
Minor, in Music	-	0.1	Burney.
Minstrel	-	4.8	Burney. See Burney's History, Mercer's ed. Cross-referenced to Romance
Minuet	-	0.5	Burney. See Burney's Travels, Scholes's ed Cross-referenced to Menuet.
Missa	Missa Papa Mercelli	0.5	Burney. See Burney's History, vol 2, p 157 of Mercer's ed. A mass by Palestrina.
Mixis	-	5 lines	Burney. Cross referenced to Melopoeia
Mixo-lydian	-	0.2	Burney.
Mixture	Mixture	3 lines	Burney. This is an organ stop. It is referenced to the article Furniture, which does not exist in this context in the Cyclopaedia.
Mode	-	0.1	Burney. See Burney's History, Mercer's ed. Cross-referenced to Canto-Fermo, and Tones of the Church.
Mode	Modes of the Ancient Greek Music	3.0	Burney. See Burney's History, Mercer's ed. Includes examples of notation. Cross-referenced to Tones of the Church, Style, Melopoeia, Modal, Prolation,
Modern	Modern Music	0.3	Burney.
Modulation	-	3.1	Burney. Includes examples of notation. After Rousseau. Cross-referenced to Composition, Counterpoint
Monochord	-	1.0	Burney. See Burney's History, Mercer's ed. Cross-referenced to Aeolus's Harp
Monody	-	0.1	Burney.
Monotonous	-	3 lines	Burney.

== Vol 24 Monster – Newton-in-the-Willows ==
Topic	Sub-Topic	Columns	Contributor/Notes
Mood	Mood or Mode	0.2	Burney. Cross-referenced to Mode, Modal and Prolation.
Mostra	-	0.1	Burney. Includes example of notation.
Motet	-	0.3	Burney. See Burney's History, Mercer's ed. Cross-referenced to Bassani and Cantata.
Motion	Motion in Music	0.1	Burney
Motion	Motion, Moto or Movimento in Italian music	0.3	Burney.
Motion	Motion in Ancient Music	4 lines	Burney. Cross-referenced to Locus.
Motivo in Italian music	-	0.3	Burney.
Mouvement	-	0.3	Burney. Cross-referenced to Measure and Motivo.
Musette	-	0.1	Burney.
Music	-	6.9	Burney after Rousseau. Cross-referenced to Musica Antiqua, Characters, Boethius, Pope Gregory, Guido, Points and Gammut.
Music	Musica Antiqua	0.1	Burney.
Music	Musica Arithmetica	2.4	Farey Sr. Cross-referenced to Interval.
Music	Music, Chromatic	4 lines	Burney. Cross-referenced to Chromatic.
Music	Music, Diatonic	1 line	Burney. Cross-referenced to Diatonic.
Music	Music, Didactic	3 lines	Burney.
Music	Music, Dramatic	4 lines	Burney. Cross-referenced to Dramatic and Recitativo.
Music	Music, Enharmonic	1 line	Burney. Cross-referenced to Enharmonic.
Music	Musica Enunciativa	2 lines	Burney.
Music	Music, Figurate	4 lines	Burney.
Music	Music, Harmonic	4 lines	Burney.
Music	Music, Historical	1 line	Burney. Cross-referenced to Historical.
Music	Music, Hyporchematic	2 lines	Burney.
Music	Music, Instrumental	2 lines	Burney.
Music	Music, Melismatic	3 lines	Burney. Cross-referenced to Melody.
Music	Music, Melopoetic	4 lines	Burney. Cross-referenced to Melody and Melopoeia.
Music	Music, Measured	3 lines	Burney.
Music	Music, Metabolic	5 lines	Burney.
Music	Music, Metric	4 lines	Burney.
Music	Music, Modern	1 line	Burney. Cross-referenced to ANTE, which does not exist in a music context.
Music	Music, Modulatory	5 lines	Burney. Cross-referenced to Mode and Modulation.
Music	Music, Odic	2 lines	Burney.
Music	Music, Organic	3 lines	Burney.
Music	Music, Pathetic	3 lines	Burney.
Music	Music, Poetic	4 lines	Burney.
Music	Music, Recitative	0.1	Burney. Cross-referenced to Recitativo.
Music	Music, Rhythmic	3 lines	Burney.
Music	Music, Scenic	1 line	Burney.
Music	Music, Signatory	4 lines	Burney.
Music	Musica Transalpina	0.5	Burney.
Music	Music, Vocal	3 lines	Burney.
Music	Music, Academy of	1 line	Burney. Cross-referenced to Academy.
Music	Music, Characters in	1 line	Burney. Cross-referenced to Characters.
Musical Accent	-	1 line	Burney. Cross-referenced to Accent.
Musical	Musical Faculties	1 line	Burney. Cross-referenced to Music.
Musical	Musical Glasses	1 line	Burney. Cross-referenced to Harmonica.
Musical	Musical Instruments of India	0.2	Burney. Refers to Plate V of music.
Musical	Musical Modes	1 line	Burney. Cross-referenced to Mode.
Musical	Musical Notes	1 line	Burney. Cross-referenced to Notes.
Musical	Musical Proportion	1 line	Burney. Cross-referenced to Proportion.
Musical	Musical Sound	1 line	Burney. Cross-referenced to Sound.
Musical	Musical String	1 line	Burney. Cross-referenced to String.
Musicalement	-	2 lines	Burney.
Musician	-	0.5	Burney.
Musicke's Monument	-	2 lines	Burney. Cross-referenced to [Thomas] Mace.
Mutation	Mutations in Music	1.2	Burney. With examples of notation. Cross-referenced to Solmisation, Gammut and Harmonic Hand.
Nacaires	-	0.2	Burney. See Burney's History, vol 1, p 605, note b, of Mercer's ed.
Nakous	-	0.1	Burney.
Naples	-	6.2	Concludes with a (0.3 col) paragraph on music there. Burney. See Burney's History, Mercer's ed. and see Burney's Travels, Scholes's ed
Natural in Music	-	0.2	Burney.
Nete in Ancient Greek Music	-	0.2	Burney.

== Vol 25 Newtonian Philosophy-Ozunusze ==
Topic	Sub-Topic	Columns	Contributor/Notes
Nibeles	-	3 lines	Burney, after Bruce. An Abyssinian musical instrument akin to a Musette.
Ninth in Music	-	0.3	Burney.
Noels	-	0.1	Burney. See Burney's History, Mercer's ed. under Carols.
Noeuds	-	0.5	Farey, sr. Scientific article. Refers to a plate.
Nome	Nome in Ancient Greek Music	0.5	Burney. See Burney's History, Mercer's ed. The rules by which Greek music was composed. Cross-referenced to Song and Mode.
Nonupla in Italian Music	-	0.3	Burney. A dance time, peculiar to jigs. Cross-referenced to Adagio, Presto and Prestissimo.
Note	NoteS	3.3	Burney. See Burney's History, Mercer's ed. under Notation. Includes examples of notation. Cross-referenced to Greek Music, Character and Time-table.
Note	Note, Sensible	0.1	Burney.
O	-	1.0	Part of this (0.3 col) is about O in Music by Burney. Includes example of notation.
Obligato in Italian Music	-	0.2	Burney. Cross-referenced to Ground.
Obligé	-	0.1	Burney.
Obliquo in Italian Music	-	0.1	Burney. Includes example of notation. Cross-referenced to Note and Ligature.
Oboe	-	1 line	Burney.
Oboista	-	1 line	Burney. An oboe player.
Octave	-	1.9	Burney or Farey, sr. Scientific article. Cross-referenced to Scale, Replicate, Compass and Diapason, Règle or Rule.
Octave	Octave, Diminished	2 lines	Burney. Cross-referenced to Diminished Octave and Interval.
Octavier	-	0.2	Burney. French term for over-blowing a wind instrument.
Octavina	-	4 lines	Burney. The article defines the term as meaning a miniature spinet. Cross-referenced to Spinet.
Octeline	-	2 lines	Burney. Synonym for the previous miniature spinet.
Ode	-	6.0	Burney? See Burney's History, Mercer's ed. Cross-referenced to Lyric Poetry and Hebrew Poetry
Olmus	-	3 lines	Burney. The head joint, containing the embouchure, of an ancient flute. Cross-referenced to Bombyx.
Ondeggiare	-	0.3	Burney.
Onofrio St	-	0.9	Burney. See Burney's Travels, Scholes's ed under Conservatorios. A music conservatory in Naples.
Opera	-	5.5	Burney. See Burney's History, Mercer's ed. and see Burney's Travels, Scholes's ed Cross-referenced to Ballet
Opera	Opera buffa	2.9	Burney. See Burney's History, Mercer's ed. and see Burney's Travels, Scholes's ed
Oratorio	-	3.7	Burney. See Burney's History, Mercer's ed. and see Burney's Travels, Scholes's ed. Cross-referenced to Mysteries and Moralities.
Orchesis	-	0.6	Burney. Cross-referenced to Mime and Pantomime
Orchesography	-	2 lines	Burney. Title of a book by Thionot Arbeau describing dance steps. Cross-referenced to Dance.
Orchestra	-	1.7	Burney. See Burney's History, Mercer's ed. and see Burney's Travels, Scholes's ed
Oreille	-	0.2	Burney. To have a musical ear, meaning good musical taste. After Rousseau. See Burney's History under Ear for Music. Cross-referenced to Ear.
Organ	Organ in Music	20.8	Burney. See Burney's History, Mercer's ed. and see Burney's Travels, Scholes's ed. Technical description of the instruments shown in the 4 plates is by Farey jr. Has paragraphs by Farey sr about enharmonic organs. Cross-referenced to Hawke's Temperament
Organ	Organ, Hydraulic	0.3	Burney. Cross-referenced to Hydrualicon
Organ	Organical in Greek Music	5 lines	Burney. Cross-referenced to Greek Music and Characters.
Organiser le Chant	-	0.2	Burney. See Burney's History, Mercer's ed.
Organo	-	3 lines	Burney. Term used by Burney to indicate than when these (and similar) pieces were played in church the ripieno parts were played on the organ.
Orgues, des	-	0.2	Burney. Note about early French organs. Cross-referenced to Organ.
Orthian	-	0.1	Burney. A nome in ancient Greek music.
Osservanza	-	0.1	Burney. Italian term for precision in performing.
Ottupla in Italian Music	-	0.4	Burney. Includes example of notation. A measure of eight.
Overture	-	0.6	Burney. See Burney's History, Mercer's ed.
Overture	Overture du livre	4 lines	Burney. French term for sight reading

== Vol 26 P-Perturbation ==
Topic	Sub-Topic	Columns	Contributor/Notes
P	-	2 lines	Burney. Italian for soft.
Pammelia	-	0.5	Burney. See Burney's History, Mercer's ed. Title of the first collection of catches, rounds, etc., published in England in 1609 by Thomas Ravenscroft.
Pantaleone	Pantaleone in music	0.3	Burney. See Burney's Travels, Scholes's ed. A species of hammer dulcimer over 9 ft long.
Pantaloon	Pantaloon in the theatre	0.1	Burney
Pantheon	Pantheon, in London	0.6	Burney. See Burney's History, Mercer's ed.
Pantomime	-	0.4	Burney. Cross-referenced to Mime, Ballet and Bathyllus
Paper	Paper, ruled for music	0.3	Burney, after Rousseau. Cross-referenced to Staff.
Parody	-	0.5	The final paragraph about musical parodies is by Burney.
Part	Part in Music	0.2	Burney.
Parthenia	-	0.3	Burney. A book of virginal lessons.
Participation	Participation in Music	0.2	Farey, sr. Scientific article.
Participato	-	0.1	Burney, after Martini.
Partie	-	0.2	Farey sr. Scientific article.
Partiti	-	2 lines	Burney.
Partition	Partition in Music	0.1	Burney.
Partitura	-	5 lines	Burney
Parypate in Ancient Music	-	0.1	Burney. Cross-referenced to Tetrachord, Diagram and Trite.
Parypate	Parypate Hypaton	4 lines	Burney. Cross-referenced to Diagram and Parybate.
Parypate	Parypate Meson	3 Lines	Burney. Cross-referenced to Diagram.
Passacaglio	-	4 lines	Burney after Brossard.
Passacaille	-	4 lines	Burney, after Rousseau.
Passage	Passage in Music	0.2	Burney.
Passamezzo	-	0.1	Burney.
Passe-pied	-	4 lines	Burney.
Passing-Notes in Music	-	0.3	Burney, after Pepusch. Refers to a plate.
Passionato	-	3 lines	Burney. Italian term indicating the piece is to be performed with passion.
Pasticcio	-	5 lines	Burney.
Pastorale	-	0.3	Burney, after Rousseau.
Pathetic	Pathetic in music	0.6	Burney, after Rousseau.
Pavan	-	0.1	Burney.
Pause	Pause in Music	0.2	Burney. Cross-referenced to Rests and Corona
Penultimate	Penultimate in Music	4 lines	Burney, after Brossard.
Penultimate	Penultimate of the Separate	4 lines	Burney. A lyre chord in ancient Greek music.
Penultimate	Penultimate of the Acute	3 lines	Burney. A lyre chord in ancient Greek music
Period	Period of Perfection in Greek Music	0.3	Burney. Account of the discussions of musical degeneracy or perfection then. See Burney's History, Mercer's ed

== Vol 27 Pertussis-Poetics ==
Topic	Sub-Topic	Columns	Contributor/Notes
Petteia in Ancient Music	-	0.4	Burney. Burney defines this as the art of composition.
Phantastic in Music	-	3 lines	Burney. Burney defines this as a free and easy Style of instrumental composition; the modern Fantasia. Cross-referenced to Style
Philodemi de MusicA	-	5.1	Burney. It concerns a Greek satire discovered at Herculaneum in 1742, but unpublished until 1793.
Phonascia	-	0.2	Burney. The art of managing the human voice.
Phonics	-	0.7	Burney. Cross-referenced to Echo.
Phorbeia	-	0.2	Burney. Cross-referenced to Flute.
Phorminx	-	2 lines	Burney. See Burney's History, Mercer's ed. Cross-referenced to Lyre.
Photinx	-	0.3	Burney. See Burney's History, Mercer's ed. A type of horn used in Ancient Egypt.
Phrase	Phrase in Music	0.3	Burney.
Phrygian MODE in Music	-	0.2	Burney.
Piano	Piano	0.2	Burney. Italian for playing softly.
Piano	Piano Forte	0.2	Burney. See Burney's History, vol 2 p 874, note n, of Mercer's ed. and see Burney's Travels, Scholes's ed. Cross-referenced to Harpsichord.
Piffero	-	1 line	Burney. Italian for flute.
Pinch in Music	-	0.2	Burney. Burney defines this as fingering used in harpsichord playing akin to a trill. Also in fingering the strings in a bowed instrument – Pizzicato.
Piobrach	-	0.1	Burney.
Pitch	Pitch in Music	0.2	Burney.
Plain	Plain Chant	2 lines	Burney. Cross-referenced to Chant and Canto Fermo.
Plain	Plain Counterpoint	0.2	Burney.
Plain	Plain Descant	1 line	Burney. Cross-referenced to Descant.
Playhouse	-	0.9	Burney. See Burney's History, Mercer's ed. Cross-referenced to Theatre and Amphitheatre.
Plectrum	Plectrum	0.1	Burney.
Plica	Plica	0.3	Burney. Includes example of notation.

== Vol 28 Poetry-Punjoor ==
Topic	Sub-Topic	Columns	Contributor/Notes
Point	Point in Music	0.3	Burney. See Burney's History, Mercer's ed. Article discusses various uses of the term 'Point' in music.
Point	Point d'Orgue	0.2	Burney. See Burney's History, Mercer's ed.
Port	Port of the Voice	4 lines	Burney.
Position	Position in Music	0.1	Burney. Article discusses various uses of the term 'Position' in music.
Positive	Positive in Music	0.1	Burney. Cross-referenced to Organ.
Prelude in Music	-	0.3	Burney. Cross-referenced to Toccata.
Preparation of Discords, in Music	-	0.8	Burney, after Rousseau. See Burney's History, Mercer's ed. under Discords. Includes example of notation. Cross-referenced to Counterpoint and Composition
Presa in Italian Music	-	0.2	Burney. A character signifying where a performer is to begin. Includes example of notation.
Prestissimo	-	2 lines	Burney.
Presto	-	5 lines	Burney.
Prima Intensione in Music	-	0.7	Burney. After Rousseau. Burney defines this is a composition that was devised entire.
Primo in Italian music	-	5 lines	Burney. Article discusses various uses of the term Primo, meaning first. e.g. alto primo = first counter tenor.
Principal	Principal in Music	5 lines	Burney. Name of an organ stop
Principalis	-	3 lines	Burney. Cross-referenced to Hypate, Tetrachord and Diagram.
Prohibito in Italian Music	-	0.1	Burney. Term meaning harshness to the listener.
Prolatio Major et Minor	-	0.7	Burney. See Burney's History, Mercer's ed. under Notation. Cross-referenced to Modal Signs and Moods.
Proportion	Proportion in Music	0.1	Farey, sr. Scientific article.
Proportion	Proportion, Harmonical or Musical	0.9	Farey, sr. Scientific article.
Proportion	Proportion, Contra-Harmonical	2 lines	Farey, sr. Cross-referenced to Contra-harmonical.
Prudenza	-	0.1	Burney. A term of caution, 'con prudenza', meaning the piece should be performed with care.
Psalmody	Psalmody, Metrical	1.9	Burney. See Burney's History, Mercer's ed. Cross-referenced to Claude Le Jeune.
Palmody	Psalmody Island	0.2	Burney. Discusses Roman Catholic psalmody and Ambrosian chant. Psalmody Island is the Camargue in the Diocese of Nismes.
Psalmody	Psalmody, Parochial	0.9	Burney. See Burney's History, Mercer's ed. The article describes psalm singing in Protestant churches
Psaltery	-	0.3	Burney. See Burney's History, Mercer's ed.

== Vol 29 Punishment-Repton ==
Topic	Sub-Topic	Columns	Contributor/Notes
Pycni in Ancient Music	-	0.2	Burney. The article discusses the various tetrachords that made up the musical tones then.
Quadro	-	0.3	Burney. Discussion of early chant notation.
Quart de Soupir	-	4 lines	Burney. Cross-referenced to Time-table and Value of Notes.
Quart de Ton	-	0.2	Burney. See Burney's History, Mercer's ed. under Quarter Tone. After Rousseau.
Quarte	-	0.2	Burney. Cross-referenced to Tritonus, chord and Accompaniment.
Quatorzieme	-	4 lines	Burney. French term meaning double octave of the 7th.
Quatrichroma in Italian Music	-	3 lines	Burney. Cross-referenced to Time and Triple.
Quatuor	-	0.3	Burney. French for Quartet
Quatuor	Quator Principalia Artis Musicae	1.0	Burney. Title of a MS book, 'Four Principles of Music', then in the Bodleian Library, Oxford
Quaver in Music	-	0.2	Burney. Includes example of notation. Cross-referenced to Crotchet, and Characters.
Quavering	-	2 lines	Burney. Same as Trill or Shake.
Queen's Theatre	-	0.7	Burney. See Burney's History, Mercer's ed. under Opera House.
Quinta	-	0.1	Burney. Cross-referenced to Fifth and Diapente.
Quinte in French music	-	0.1	Burney.
Quintello	-	0.1	Burney.
Quinter	-	3 lines	Burney. French term for Counterpoint in 5ths.
Rallentando	-	0.1	Burney.
Ranelagh Rotunda and Gardens	-	0.7	Burney. See Burney's History, Mercer's ed. Date 1809 mentioned.
Ravalement	-	0.6	Burney. French term. Extending a keyboard instrument to five octaves.
Rebec	-	0.3	Burney. See Burney's History, Mercer's ed.
Recit	-	0.2	Burney. French term for a musical solo;
Recitativo	-	1.8	Burney. See Burney's History, Mercer's ed. and see Burney's Musical Travels, Scholes' ed. Cross-referenced to Opera, Air, Motiva and Measure
Recorder	-	1 line	Burney. Cross-referenced to a piece titled Record, which does not exist in the Cyclopaedia.
Red	Red Notes in Old Music	0.3	Burney. Discusses the use of rubrification before the days of printing to indicate diminution of volume. Cross-referenced to Machau.
Regal	Regal in Music	0.6	Burney.
Register	Register in organ building	0.1	Burney. The slider by which a rank of organ pipes can be made to sound.
Regle de l'Octave	-	1.0	Burney. See Burney's History, Mercer's ed. After Rousseau. Cross referenced to Accompaniment and Thorough-base. Counterpoint, Composition.
Relatio in Music	-	0.6	Burney. Includes example of notation.
Renversé	-	4 lines	Burney. Cross-referenced to Direct.
Renversement	-	0.5	Burney. French for inversion in music. Cross-referenced to Harmonics, Resonance and Face.
Renvoi in Music	-	4 lines	Burney. With example of notation. Cross-referenced to Repeat
Repeat in Music	-	0.4	Burney. Cross-referenced to Characters in Music.
Repercussion	Repercussion in Music	0.1	Burney.
Repetition	Repetition in Music	0.1	Burney.
Replique in Music	-	0.2	Burney.
Reponse	-	5 lines	Burney. Cross referenced to Fugue and Counter-subject
Reprise	Reprise in Music	0.2	Burney. With example of notation. Cross-referenced to Renvoi and Reference.

== Vol 30 Republic-Rzemien ==
Topic	Sub-Topic	Columns	Contributor/Notes
Resolution	Resolution in Music	0.2	Burney.
Resonance in Music	-	0.4	Burney. Cross-referenced to Echo.
Responsory Song	-	2 lines	Burney.
Responsoria	-	2 lines	Burney.
Rest	Rest in Music	0.8	Burney. See Burney's History, Mercer's ed. under Notation. Cross-referenced to Characters in Music and Time-table.
Retrogrado in Music	-	4 lines	Burney. Cross-referenced to Canon.
Retto	-	0.2	Burney. Italian term meaning to play a Scale
Revels	-	0.1	Burney.
Rhapsodi	-	0.8	Burney. See Burney's History, Mercer's ed.
Rhythm	-	12.2	Burney. Includes examples of notation.
Ribattuta	-	2 lines	Burney.
Ribattuta	Ribattuta di Gola	0.2	Burney. Includes example of notation.
Risolutione	-	2 lines	Burney. Cross-referenced to Discord and Preparation.
Risoluto	-	2 lines	Burney.
Risposta	-	5 lines	Burney. Cross referenced to Fugue.
Risvigliato	-	3 lines	Burney. Italian term implying vivacity and spirit
Ritardato	-	3 lines	Burney. Italian term meaning the same as rallentando.
Ritornello	-	0.3	Burney.
Ritrogrado	-	1 line	Burney. Cross-referenced to Retrogrado.
Rivogliomento	-	1.0	Burney. Italian term meaning to change the place of the parts of a composition, e.g. treble for tenor. It occurs in Counterpoint, and known as double Counterpoint.
Rivoltare	-	1 line	Burney. Italian for inversion.
Robe	Robes To Minstrels	1.7	Burney. An outline of the costume and rewards of the medieval minstrels in the courts of Europe.
Rolle	Rolle in Music	0.2	Burney. French term meaning a musical part
Roman	Roman Ecclesiastical singing in Music	0.3	Burney. Cross-referenced to Italy
Roman	Roman Operas	0.4	Burney.
Rondeau	-	0.3	Burney, after Rousseau.
Roulade	-	0.9	Burney, after Rousseau. Cross-referenced to Neume and Language, Euphony of.
Round in Music	-	0.1	Burney. Cross-referenced to Roundelay
Roundelay	-	0.4	Burney. See Burney's History, Mercer's ed. Cross-referenced to Rondeau.
Russia	-	55.7	Tooke. In the middle of column 30 is a paragraph (0.5 col) about music, perhaps by Burney
Russian Music, in the Church	-	1 line.	Burney, Cross-referenced to Greek Church.
Russian Secular Music	-	2.4	Burney. See Burney's Musical Tours, Scholes's ed. Cross-referenced to Chase and Sarti.

== Vol 31 S-Scotium ==
Topic	Sub-Topic	Columns	Contributor/Notes
Sacbut	-	0.6	Burney.
Sadler	Sadler's Wells	0.2	Burney.
Salmi	-	0.3	Burney. Italian for Psalms.
Salmodia	-	4 lines	Burney
Saltarella	-	0.1	Burney. With examples of notation. See Burney's History, Mercer's ed.
Sauver	-	0.1	Burney, after Rousseau. French term meaning to resolve a discord. Cross-referenced to Counterpoint, Resolution and Cadence.
Saxons	-	16.4	Main article is about the Anglo-Saxons and is not by Burney, but towards the end are paragraphs about music and poetry then, say Half a column. See Burney's History, Mercer's ed., under Bede.
Scale in Music	-	0.2	Burney. See Burney's History, Mercer's ed.
Scale	Scale in the music of the ancients	1 line	Burney.
Scale	Scale of the Chinese	1.0	Burney. See Burney's History, Mercer's ed. Includes example of notation. Cross-referenced to Chinese Music.
Scena	-	0.1	Burney
Scenic Games	-	0.4	Burney. See Burney's History, Mercer's ed, vol 1, p 370
Scolia	Scolia or Songs of the Ancient Greeks	3.3	Burney. See Burney's History, Mercer's ed.
Schools	School, or College of Singers	1 line	Burney. Established at Rome by St. Gregory. See Burney'd History, Mercer's ed
Schools	Schools of Singing [in England]	1 line	Burney. Burney. See Burney's History, Mercer's ed. Cross-referenced to Bede.
Schools	Schools of Ecclesiastical Singing	0.3	Burney. See Burney's History, Mercer's ed.

== Vol 32 Scotland-Sindy ==
Topic	Sub-Topic	Columns	Contributor/Notes
Segno	-	0.2	Burney.
Segue	-	0.1	Burney
Seguenza	-	0.2	Burney.
Semi	-	0.3	Burney. Cross-referenced to Musical Characters and Time-table.
Semibreve	-	2 lines	Burney.See index to Burney's History, Mercer's ed. Cross-referenced to Time-table.
Semi-diapason	-	3 lines	Burney. Cross referenced to Diapason
Semi-diapente	-	2 lines	Burney. A defective fifth.
Semi-diatessaron	-	2 lines	Burney. A defective fourth.
Semi-ditone	-	1 line	Birney. Cross referenced to Diapason
Semi-ditone, Dis-diapason	-	1 line	Burney. Cross referenced to Dis-diapason
Semi-ditonus	-	2 lines	Burney. A minor third.
Semiquaver	-	1 line	Burney. Cross-referenced to Quaver
Semisisospiro in Italian Music	-	2 lines	Burney. A pause lasting 1/8 of a bar in common time.
Semitone in Music	-	1.0	Burney. Cross-referenced to Interval, Modern Chromatic.
Semitonic Scale	-	1.2	Burney.
Senatus-consultum	-	1.8	Burney. Paragraphs by Burney (1.6 col). See Burney's History, Mercer's ed. under Timotheus. Relates to Timotheus's adding of extra strings to his lyre. Cross-referenced to Senate.
Septieme	-	0.9	Burney. Cross-references to Pepusch, Music Plates, Intervals, chords, Modulation and Counterpoint.
Serenade	-	0.6	Burney.
Serinette	-	0.1	Burney. A small organ used to teach birds little tunes. After l'Encyclopédie.
Service	Service, Choral in Church Music	3.6	Burney. See Burney's History, 1, pp 409–56 and 2, pp 475–495. Includes references to both Hawkins and Burney. Cross-referenced to Antiphony, Liturgy
Service	Services of the Church	0.1	Burney. Cross-referenced to Cathedral Service.
Service	Cathedral Music	0.4	Burney.
Sesqui	-	0.2	Burney. Numeral prefix for one and a Half.
Sesquialter	-	0.1	Burney. Burney defines this as an organ stop implying a whole and a Half. Large organs had five ranks of pipes in this stop.
Sesqui-alterate, the greater perfect	-	3 lines	Burney.
Sesqui-alterate	Sesqui-alterate, the greater imperfect	3 lines	Burney.
Sesqui-alterate	Sesqui-alterate, lesser perfect	3 lines	Burney.
Sesqui-alterate	Sesqui-alterate, lesser imperfect	3 lines	Burney.
Sesquiditone	-	4 lines	Burney. Cross referenced to Ditone and Interval
Sesqui-octave	-	3 lines	Burney. Burney defines this as a kind of triple, with nine quavers to a bar.
Sesqui-quarta Dupla	-	4 lines	Burney. Burney defines this as a kind of triple, with nine crotchets to a bar.
Seville	-	4.5	In the second full column of the article is an account,(0.2 col) of the organ at Seville Cathedral. By Burney?
Sextulpa	-	0.2	Burney.
Sextulpa	Sextulpa of the Semibreve	4 lines	Burney.
Sextulpa	Sextulpa of the Minim	3 lines	Burney.
Sextulpa	Sextulpa of the Crochet	3 lines	Burney.
Sextulpa	Sextulpa of the Chroma	3 lines	Burney.
Sextulpa	Sextulpa of the Semichroma	3 lines	Burney.
Shake	-	1.2	Burney. With examples of notation. Cross-referenced to Gruppo and Trill.
Shakespeare	-	20.0	After the references section the article concludes with section(6.1 col) by Burney on Shakespeare and music. See Burney's History, Mercer's ed.
Sharp	Sharp in Music	0.3	Burney. With example of notation. Cross-referenced to Natural.
Shift	-	0.3	Burney. This refers to 1809, so must be one of the last articles Burney wrote.
Sifflet	-	5 lines	Burney, after Laborde.
Silence	-	1 line	Burney. French for a rest.
Simplicity	Simplicity in Music	0.5	Burney. Burney bemoans that the English do not have a native music, unlike the Scots, Welsh and Irish. Cross-referenced to Hornpipe and the plate of National Tunes, which was never engraved.

== Vol 33 Sines-Starboard ==
Topic	Sub-Topic	Columns	Contributor/Notes
Singing	-	0.4	Burney. See Burney's Musical Tours, Scholes's ed. Cross-referenced to Sol-fa-ing and Choral Service.
Singing	Singing, Processional	0.4	Burney.
Singing	Singing, in the Church by primitive Christians	0.4	Burney.
Singing	Singing, Celestial	0.4	Burney.
Singing	Singing, in England by Madrigalists	0.3	Burney
Singing	Singing, Parochial	2 lines	Burney. Cross referenced to Psalmody and Sternhold and Hopkins.
Singing	Singing, in Italy	0.2	Burney
Singing	Singing, in France	2 lines	Burney. See Burney's History, Mercer's ed. Cross-referenced to Mersennis and St. Evremond.
Singing	Singing, in England	1.3	Burney. See Burney's History, Mercer's ed..
Sistrum	-	0.5	Burney. See Burney's History, Mercer's ed.
Sixth	-	1.0	Burney.
Slur	-	0.2	Burney.
Smorzato	-	0.1	Burney. Term meaning to play softly.
Society	Society or Fund for the Support of Decayed Musicians ...	0.4	Burney. See Burney's History, Mercer's ed. under Royal Society of Musicians
Soggetto	-	0.3	Burney. Cross-referenced to Fugue, Canto Fermo, Double Counterpoint and Rosengrave
Sol-fa-ing	-	1.4	Burney. Cross-referenced to Harmonical Hand.
Solfeggiamento	-	3 Lines	Burney. Cross referenced to the next article.
Solfeggiare	-	0.2	Burney.
Solmisation	-	3 lines	Burney. See Burney's History, Mercer's ed. Cross-referenced to Mutations and Serra.
Solmisation	Solmisation of the Greeks	0.2	Burney. See Burney's History, Mercer's ed.
Solo	Solo in Italian Music	0.5	Burney.
Sonata	-	0.3	Burney
Song	-	8.3	Burney. See Burney's History, Mercer's ed. and see Burney's Musical Travels, Scholes ed. Cross-referenced to Air.
Song	Song of Birds	1.9	Burney?
Song	Song, Responsory	1 line	Burney. Cross-referenced to Responsory.
Sons Harmoniques	-	0.5	Burney. Mentions a table of harmonic sounds in the Plates. Cross-referenced to Noise.
Sordino	-	0.1	Burney
Souffleur	-	1 line	Burney. French term for the bellows blower of an organ.
Sound	Sound in Music	5.8	Burney? or Farey sr? Cross-referenced to Concord, Discord and Relation, Tetrachord and System of the ancient Greeks.
Sound	Sounds, Harmonical	1.1	Burney? or Farey sr? Sons Harmonique, Harmonics and Harmony.
Sound	Sounds, Third	2.1	Burney.
Sound-board, or Wind-chest	-	0.2	Burney.
Spain	Spain, History of Music in Spain	3.6	Burney. Cross-referenced to Morales, Lorente, Dr Worgan, Nassare.
Speculative	Speculative Music	4 lines	Burney. Term meaning scientific music.
Speculum	Speculum Musicæ	1.0	Burney.
Spinet	-	0.8	Burney. Cross-referenced to Jack and Tongue, Keys and Scale

== Vol 34 Starch-Szydlow ==
Topic	Sub-Topic	Columns	Contributor/Notes
Stilo	-	0.4	Burney. Italian for Style in music.
Strain	-	5 lines	Burney.
Stravaganza	-	0.3	Burney. Term coined by Vivaldi for set of twelve concertos. Cross-referenced to Vivaldi.
String	-	1.8	Burney? or Farey sr.? Cross referenced to Unison, Sons Harmoniques, Vibrations, Fundamental, Generate, chord, Harmoinics.
Stromento	-	0.2	Burney. Italian term for Instruments. Cross referenced to Instrument.
Style	-	1 line	Burney. Cross-reference to Stilo.
Subdominante	-	5 lines	Burney, after Rameau.
Subject	Subject in Music	0.5	Burney. Cross-referenced to Counterpoint.
Suite	-	0.3	Burney.
Superfluous Interval, in Music	-	3 lines	Burney. Cross-referenced to Interval.
Superfluous	Superfluous Second	0.1	Burney. Cross-referenced to Chromatic and Second.
Superfluous	Superfluous Third	0.1	Burney.
Superfluous	Superfluous Fourth	3 lines	Burney. Cross-referenced to Interval.
Superfluous	Superfluous Fifth	3 lines	Burney.
Superfluous	Superfluous Sixth	0.2	Burney. Cross-referenced to Interval and Diminished Third.
Superfluous	Superfluous Seventh	0.2 lines	Burney. Cross-referenced to Interval.
Superfluous	Superfluous Octave	3 lines	Burney.
Superius in Music	-	2 lines	Burney.
Symphoniale	-	5 lines	Burney.
Symphony	-	0.8	Burney. Relates to an antique musical instrument, variously called a lyre, hammer dulcimer or hurdy-gurdy.
Symphony	Symphony, σνμφωνία	0.9	Burney. Dated 1804 and mentions Beethoven. See Burney's History, pp 945, 958 of Mercer's ed.
Synaphe in Ancient Greek Music	-	0.1	Burney. Cross-referenced to System and Tetrachord.
Syncope and Syncopation in Music	-	0.7	Burney.
Syrinx	-	0.8	Burney.
System	System in Music	0.4	Burney. Cross-referenced to Interval.
System	System in Ancient Greek Music	3 lines	Burney. Cross-referenced to Greek Music, Composition, Counterpoint, Harmony, Melopoeia, Mutations and Rhythm.
System	Roman music	0.3	Burney.
System	System of Guido	0.4	Burney. Cross-referenced to Guido, Gammut or Scale, Hexachords, Points and Counterpoint
System	System of Rameau	0.6	Burney. Cross-referenced to Basse Fondamentale.
System	System of Tartini	1.6	Burney.
System	System of Kirnberger	5.0	Burney. With examples of notation. Cross-referenced to Discord
System	System of Solmisation	0.9	Burney. With example of notation. Cross-referenced to Hexachord and Mutations.

== Vol 35 T-Toleration ==
Topic	Sub-Topic	Columns	Contributor/Notes
T	-	0.1	Burney. Initial letter of musical words like Tenor.
Ta	Ta, τα	2 lines	Burney. One of the four syllables used by the ancient Greeks in solmisation, or the first lessons in singing.
Tablature	Tablature in Music	0.3	Burney.
Tableau	-	0.1	Burney, after Rousseau.
Tace	-	1 line	Burney. Italian for to be silent.
Tacet	-	3 lines	Burney. Latin for to be silent
Tagliato	-	0.2	Burney. With example of notation.
Tambour	-	1 line	Burney. French for drum.
Tambour	Tambour de Basque	3 lines	Burney.
Tambourin	-	3 lines	Burney.
Tarantara	-	2 lines	Burney. According to Ennius, the military trumpet's flourish of the Romans.
Tarantella	-	4 lines	Burney.
Tardo	-	2 lines	Burney.
Tastatura	-	0.1	Burney. Italian for a musical instrument keyboard.
Taste	Taste in music	0.5	Burney.
Taste	Taste in singing and playing	0.2	Burney. After Rousseau.
Tasto	Tasto in Italian Music	0.1	Burney.
Tasto	Tasto solo	0.2	Burney.
Tatto	-	3 lines	Burney. Cross referenced to Tactus and Battuta
Te Deum	-	1.1	Burney.
Temperament	Temperament in Music	11.8	Farey, sr. Scientific article. Cross-referenced to Interval, Ratio, Diesis, Music, Sound.
Tems	-	2 lines	Burney. French for time.
Tenella, τευελλα, in Ancient Music	-	0.3	Burney. Relates to a poem by Archelochus about Hercules.
Tenor	Tenor in Vocal Music	0.2	Burney. Cross-referenced to CLEF.
Tenor	Tenor or Tenorista	3 lines	Burney.
Terza	Terza in Music	2 lines	Burney. Italian for the third. Cross referenced to Concords and Intervals
Terzetto in Italian Music	-	2 lines	Burney. Cross-referenced to Trio.
Terzini	-	2 lines	Burney. Italian for musical triplets.
Terzo Suono [of Tartini]	-	0.8	Burney. Includes example of notation.
Testa	Testa in Italian Singing	0.2	Burney.
Testo	-	0.3	Burney.
Testudo in Antiquity	-	0.3	Burney.
Tetrachord	-	0.5	Burney. With example of notation. Cross-referenced to Greek Music
Theme	Theme in Music	0.5	Burney.
Theorbo	-	0.4	Burney.
Third	-	0.8	Burney.
Thorough	Thorough-Base	1.6	Burney. Refers to the musical plates of the Cyclopaedia. Cross-referenced to Composition and Counterpoint. See Burney's History, Mercer's ed.
Tibicen in Ancient Music	-	1 line	Burney. A flute player in antiquity.
Tierce	Tierce in Music	3 lines	Burney. Cross-reference to Third
Tierce	Tierce de Picardie	0.5	Burney.
Time	Time in Music	0.7	Burney. Cross-referenced to Note and Characters
Time	Time, Common or Duple	0.8	Burney.
Time	Time, Triple	1 line	Burney. Cross-referenced to Triple-Time
Toccata	-	3 lines	Burney.
Toccatina	-	2 lines	Burney.

== Vol 36 Tol-Ver ==
Topic	Sub-Topic	Columns	Contributor/Notes
Tone	Tone in Music	0.7	Burney. Cross referenced to Tune.
Tonic	Tonic in Music	1 line	Burney. Cross referenced to Genus
Tons de l'Eglise	-	1.3	Burney. Refers to a plate. Cross referenced to Plain-chant, Canto Fermo, Ecclesiastical Modes, Authentic and Plagal, St. Ambrose and St Gregory.
Tonton	-	0.1	Burney.
Transparent	-	0.2	Burney. Burney's thoughts on the need for clarity in both composition and performance.
Transposition	Transposition in Music	0.6	Burney. Includes example of notation. Cross-referenced to Clefs and Cerone,
Travailler	-	0.2	Burney. French for labour, work. In a musical context it means a well-constructed piece that works.
Traversiere, Flute	-	0.4	Burney. Cross-referenced to Tacet.
Treble in Music	-	0.2	Burney.
Tremblant in Music	-	0.1	Burney. A type of organ stop used on the continent. Cross-referenced to Organ.
Tricord	-	0.3	Burney. A three-stringed instrument used in Antiquity
Trigon	-	0.1	Burney. Cross-referenced to Trigonum.
Trigonum	-	0.3	Burney. A triangular harp used in Antiquity. Refers to the Plate of ancient instruments.
Triple	Triple in Music	1.0	Burney. Cross-referenced to Notation and Minuet.
Triple	Triple progression in Harmonics	0.3	Burney.
Tritonus	-	0.2	Burney. With example of notation. Cross-referenced to Fifth.
Trombone	-	1.1	Burney. With example of notation.
Tronco	-	1.1	Burney. Italian for to curtail.
TroubadourS	-	2.0	Burney. See Burney's History, Mercer's ed. Cross-referenced to Jongleurs, Minstrel, Mystery, Provençal Poets and Romance.
Trumpet	-	2.6	Burney. See Burney's History, Mercer's ed. Cross-referenced to Lituus. Musical Numbers.
Trumpet	Trumpet-Marine	0.5	Burney, Mentions Plate XXIV of Miscelleny, fig 4.
Trumpet	Trumpet, Harmonical	4 lines	Burney. Synonym for Sacbut.
Tune	-	1.7	Burney. Cross-referenced to Ballad, Gravity.
Tymbales	-	0.2	Burney. With example of notation. French for Kettle Drum. Cross-referenced to Drum and Kettle-Drum.
Tymbre	-	0.2	Burney. French for Timbre.
Valeur des Notes	-	0.6	Burney. French for Value of musical notes. Cross-referenced to Musical Characters, Time and p-late Time Table.
Vauxhall Gardens	-	0.3	Burney. See Burney's History, Mercer's ed. Cross-referenced to Lambeth and Tyers.

== Vol 37 Vermes-Waterloo ==
Topic	Sub-Topic	Columns	Contributor/Notes
Vide	-	0.2	Burney. French for an open string. Cross referenced to Shift and Finger-board
Vielle	-	0.4	Burney. See Burney's History, Mercer's ed. under Hurdy Gurdy.
Viol	-	1.1	Burney. See Burney's History, Mercer's ed. Cross referenced to Gamba
Viola	-	0.4	Burney. See Burney's History, Mercer's ed. Includes example of notation.
Violin	-	3.2	Burney. See Burney's History, Mercer's ed. Includes example of notation.
Violincello	-	0.8	Burney. See Burney's History, Mercer's ed. Includes example of notation.
Violone	-	0.2	Burney. See Burney's History, Mercer's ed.
Umbrella	-	0.2	The article concludes with a paragraph by Burney? about the umbrella as a sound reflector.
Undulation	Undulation or Beat in Music	0.8	Farey, sr. Scientific article. Cross-referenced to Beat.
Unison in Music	-	1.8	Farey, sr. Scientific article. Cross-referenced to chord.
Unity	Unity of Melody	1.6	Burney, quoting Rousseau.
Univoque in Music	-	4 lines	Burney.
Vocal	Vocal music	0.5	Burney. Cross-referenced to Measure and Rhythmus, Synaulia
Voce Sola in Music	-	6 lines	Burney.
Voice in Psysiology	-	9.7	At the end of the first page of gathering 3 I is the start of a (1.7) col section by Burney on the voice in singing.
Voice	Voice, Part of the, in Music	1 line	Burney. Cross referenced to Part.
Voice	Voice, of a Singer, Accidents and Disorders ...	0.3	Burney.
Volta	Volta in Italian Music	0.1	Burney.
Voltare	-	6 lines	Burney. Italian for to turn a page of music over.
Volume De Voix, in French music	-	0.3	Burney. A singer's compass or vocal range
Voluntary, in Music	-	0.4	Burney. Cross-referenced to Research.
Vox	Vox humana	0.3	Burney.
Waits in Music	-	0.4	Burney. See Burney's History, Mercer's ed.
Walsingham	Walsingham [Virginal tune]	0.4	Burney.
Waltz	-	0.2	Burney.

== Vol 38 Water-Wzetin ==
Topic	Sub-Topic	Columns	Contributor/Notes
Water-Organ	-	1 line	Burney. See Burney's History Mercer's ed. Cross-referenced to Organ.
Wind	Wind-Instrument in Music	0.1	Burney Cross-referenced to Instrument and Music. fenced to Instrument

== Vol 39 X-Zytomiers with Addenda ==
Topic	Sub-Topic	Columns	Contributor/Notes
Zampogna	-	4 lines	Burney. Italian for flute-like.
Zoppo	-	0.3	Burney. With example of notation. Cross-referenced to Obligato
Zygia	Zygia in the Instrumental music of the Ancients	0.1	Burney. A double-flute played at weddings.
Addenda and Corrigenda			
Pandeans	-	0.5	Burney. Plate VI of Musical instruments is of the Italian musicians playing Pan-pipes at Vauxhall Gardens in about 1805. The artist was Burney's nephew, Edward Francesco Burney.
Violin	-	0.2	Burney. Additional paragraph on the art of bowing
Water-organ	-	1 line	Burney. Cross referenced to Hydraulicon
Welsh Music	-	4.5	Burney. Includes examples of notation. Cross-referenced to Giraldus Cambrensis
Westminster Abbey	-	1.0	Burney. A discussion of the Handel Commemoration Festival of 1784
