= Hypolocrian mode =

Type of musical scale

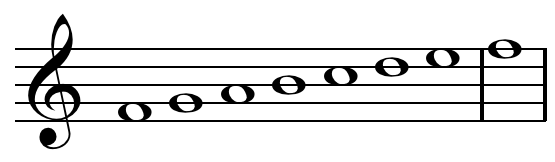
Hypolocrian mode on B

The Hypolocrian mode is an almost entirely theoretical mode, introduced into chant theory in the 19th century by the editors of the Pustet-Ratisbon, Mechlin, and Rheims-Cambrai Office-Books, who designated it mode 12. It is the plagal counterpart to the authentic Locrian mode, mode 11 in that system of numbering, in which the Ionian and Hypoionian become modes 13 and 14. The ambitus of the mode lies between F and the F an octave higher, divided at the final, B. Its reciting tone (or tenor), is E, and its mediant is D. It has two participants, G and C. Although a few plainchant melodies, as well as polyphonic compositions, have been attributed to this mode by some writers, it will generally be found that they are really derived, by transposition, from some other tonality.
