= Ribattuta =

Ribattuta or Ribattuta di gola is a musical ornament found in Italian and German works of the 17th and 18th centuries.

== Execution ==
The ornament is a trill on a long-short dotted rhythm accelerating to end on either a tremolo or a regular trill.
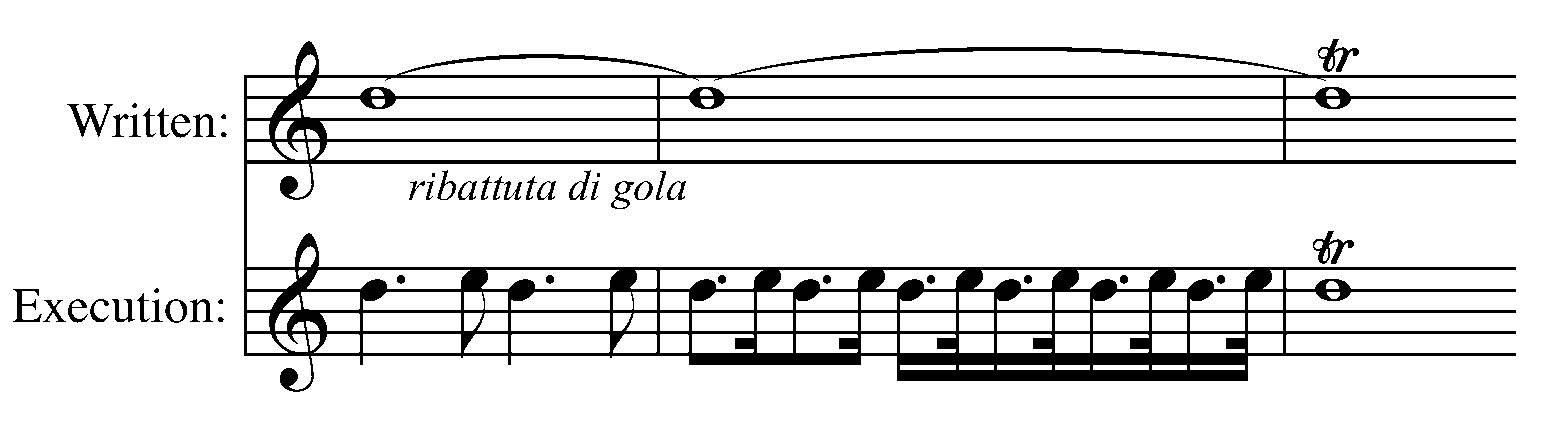

== Sources ==
The ornament is described by Mattheson (1739), Spiess (1745), and Marpurg (1749).

Frederick Neumann notes the trill following the dotted preparation is a main-note trill (that is, starting on the written note), and he cautions against use of the term as a general descriptor for dotted alternation as a prelude to a trill.

== Nomenclature ==
Italian: ribattuta (f) di gola
German: der Zurückschlag or der gedehnte oder punctirte Triller (Mattheson)
English: ribattuta
French: ribattuta (f) or tour de gosier (Marpurg) or cadence pleine à progression (Lacassagne) or double cadence (Bérard-Blanchet)
