= Aeolian mode =

Musical mode

The Aeolian mode is a musical mode or, in modern usage, a diatonic scale also called the natural minor scale. On the piano, using only the white keys, it is the scale that starts with A and continues to the next A only striking white keys. Its ascending interval form consists of a key note, whole step, half step, whole step, whole step, half step, whole step, whole step. That means that, in A aeolian (or A minor), a scale would be played beginning in A, move up a whole step (two piano keys) to B, move up a half step (one piano key) to C, then up a whole step to D, a whole step to E, a half step to F, a whole step to G, and a final whole step to a high A.

== History ==
The word Aeolian, like the names for the other ancient Greek tonoi and harmoniai, is an ethnic designation: in this case, for the inhabitants of Aeolis (Αἰολίς), a coastal district of Anatolia. In the music theory of ancient Greece, it was an alternative name (used by some later writers, such as Cleonides) for what Aristoxenus called the Low Lydian tonos (in the sense of a particular overall pitching of the musical system—not a scale), nine semitones higher than the lowest "position of the voice", which was called Hypodorian. In the mid-16th century, this name was given by Heinrich Glarean to his newly defined ninth mode, with the diatonic octave species of the natural notes extending one octave from A to A—corresponding to the modern natural minor scale. Up until this time, chant theory recognized eight musical modes: the relative natural scales in D, E, F and G, each with their authentic and plagal counterparts, and with the option of B♭ instead of B♮ in several modes.

In 1547, Heinrich Petri published Heinrich Glarean's Dodecachordon in Basel. His premise had as its central idea the existence of twelve diatonic modes rather than eight, including a separate pair of modes each on the finals A and C. Finals on these notes, as well as on B♮, had been recognized in chant theory at least since Hucbald in the early tenth century, but they were regarded as merely transpositions from the regular finals a fifth lower. In the eleventh century, Guido d'Arezzo, in chapter 8 of his Micrologus, designated these transposed finals A, B♮, and C as "affinals", and later still the term "confinal" was used in the same way. In 1525, Pietro Aaron was the first theorist to explain polyphonic modal usage in terms of the eightfold system, including these transpositions. As late as 1581, Illuminato Aiguino da Brescia published the most elaborate theory defending the eightfold system for polyphonic music against Glarean's innovations, in which he regarded the traditional plainchant modes 1 and 2 (Dorian and Hypodorian) at the affinal position (that is, with their finals on A instead of D) as a composite of species from two modes, which he described as "mixed modes". Glarean added Aeolian as the name of the new ninth mode: the relative natural mode in A with the perfect fifth as its dominant, reciting tone, reciting note, or tenor. The tenth mode, the plagal version of the Aeolian mode, Glarean called Hypoaeolian ("under Aeolian"), based on the same relative scale, but with the minor third as its tenor, and having a melodic range from a perfect fourth below the tonic to a perfect fifth above it.

Scholars for the past three centuries have regarded the modes added by Glarean as the basis of the minor/major division of classical European music, as homophonic music replaced Renaissance polyphony. Howard S Powers considers this to be an oversimplification, since the key of A minor is as closely related to the old transposed modes 1 and 2 (Dorian and Hypodorian) with finals on A—as well as to mode 3 (Phrygian)—as it is to Glarean's Aeolian.

In modern usage, the Aeolian mode is the sixth mode of the major scale and has the following formula:

1, 2, ♭3, 4, 5, ♭6, ♭7, 8

The Aeolian mode is the sixth mode of the major scale, that is, it is formed by starting on the sixth degree (submediant) of the major scale. For example, if the Aeolian mode is used in its all-white-note pitch based on A, this would be an A-minor triad, which would be the submediant in the relative major key of C major.

== Aeolian harmony ==
All harmony Aeolian except for the Picardy third ending this i–v–i–iv–i–v–I progression

Aeolian harmony is harmony or chord progression created from chords of the Aeolian mode. Commonly known as the "natural minor" scale, it allows for the construction of the following triads (three note chords built from major or minor thirds), in popular music symbols: i, ii^{o}, ♭III, iv, v, ♭VI, and ♭VII. The leading-tone and major V which contains it are also not used, as they are not part of the Aeolian mode (natural minor scale). However, Aeolian harmony may be used with mode mixture.

For example, ♭VII is a major chord built on the seventh scale degree, indicated by capital Roman numerals for seven.

There are common subsets including i–♭VII–♭VI, i–iv–v and blues minor pentatonic derived chord sequences such as I–♭III–IV, I–IV, ♭VII (The verse of "I'm Your Man"). All these lack perfect cadences (V–I), and may be thought of as derived from rewrite rules using recursive fourth structures (repeated progression by perfect fourth, see circle progression). Middleton suggests of modal and fourth-oriented structures that, rather than being, "distortions or surface transformations of Schenker's favoured V–I kernel, it is more likely that both are branches of a deeper principle, that of tonic/not-tonic differentiation."

== Songs that use Aeolian mode ==
The Aeolian mode is identical with the natural minor scale. Thus, it is ubiquitous in minor-key music. The following is a list of some examples that are distinguishable from ordinary minor tonality, which also uses the melodic minor scale and the harmonic minor scale as required.

- Traditional – "God Rest You Merry, Gentlemen"
- Bob Dylan – "All Along the Watchtower"
- R.E.M. – "Losing My Religion"
- Phil Collins – "In the Air Tonight"
- Alter Bridge – "Blackbird"
- Fleetwood Mac – "Isn't It Midnight"
- Pink Floyd – "Shine on you Crazy Diamond"
- Dido – "White Flag"
- Radiohead – "Street Spirit"
- Red Hot Chili Peppers – "Californication"
- Madonna – “La Isla Bonita”
- Beatles – “Not a Second Time”

== See also ==
- Borrowed chord (or mode mixture)
- Relative minor
- Minor scale
- Asavari, the equivalent scale (thaat) in Hindustani music
- Natabhairavi, the equivalent scale (melakarta) in Carnatic music
