= Ionian mode =

Musical mode

The Ionian mode is a musical mode or, in modern usage, a diatonic scale also called the major scale. It is named after the Ionian Greeks.

It is the name assigned by Heinrich Glarean in 1547 to his new authentic mode on C (mode 11 in his numbering scheme), which uses the diatonic octave species from C to the C an octave higher, divided at G (as its dominant, reciting tone/reciting note or tenor) into a fourth species of perfect fifth (tone–tone–semitone–tone) plus a third species of perfect fourth (tone–tone–semitone): C D E F G + G A B C. This octave species is essentially the same as the major mode of tonal music.

Church music had been explained by theorists as being organised in eight musical modes: the scales on D, E, F, and G in the "greater perfect system" of "musica recta", each with their authentic and plagal counterparts.

Glarean's twelfth mode was the plagal version of the Ionian mode, called Hypoionian (under Ionian), based on the same relative scale, but with the major third as its tenor, and having a melodic range from a perfect fourth below the tonic, to a perfect fifth above it.

== See also ==
- Bilawal, the equivalent scale (thaat) in Hindustani music
- Shankarabharanam, the equivalent scale (melakarta) in Carnatic music

== Notes ==
=== References ===
- Jones, George Thaddeus. 1974. "Medieval Church Modes", in his Music Theory: The Fundamental Concepts of Tonal Music, Including Notation, Terminology, and Harmony, 42–43. Barnes & Noble Outline Series 137. New York, Hagerstown, San Francisco, London: Barnes & Noble Books; Toronto: Fitzhenry & Whiteside. ISBN 0-06-460137-4, 0-06-467168-2 OCLC 834716
- Powers, Harold S. 2001a. "Ionian". The New Grove Dictionary of Music and Musicians, 2nd edition, 29 vols., edited by Stanley Sadie and John Tyrrell, 12:. London: Macmillan; New York: Grove's Dictionaries of Music. ISBN 978-1-56159-239-5.
- Powers, Harold S. 2001b. "Mode". The New Grove Dictionary of Music and Musicians, 2nd edition, 29 vols., edited by Stanley Sadie and John Tyrrell, 16:. London: Macmillan; New York: Grove's Dictionaries of Music. ISBN 978-1-56159-239-5.
- Powers, Harold S. 2001c. "Hypoionian". The New Grove Dictionary of Music and Musicians, 2nd edition, 29 vols., edited by Stanley Sadie and John Tyrrell, 12:37–38. London: Macmillan; New York: Grove's Dictionaries of Music. ISBN 978-1-56159-239-5.
