= Heinrich Glarean =

Swiss music theorist, poet and humanist

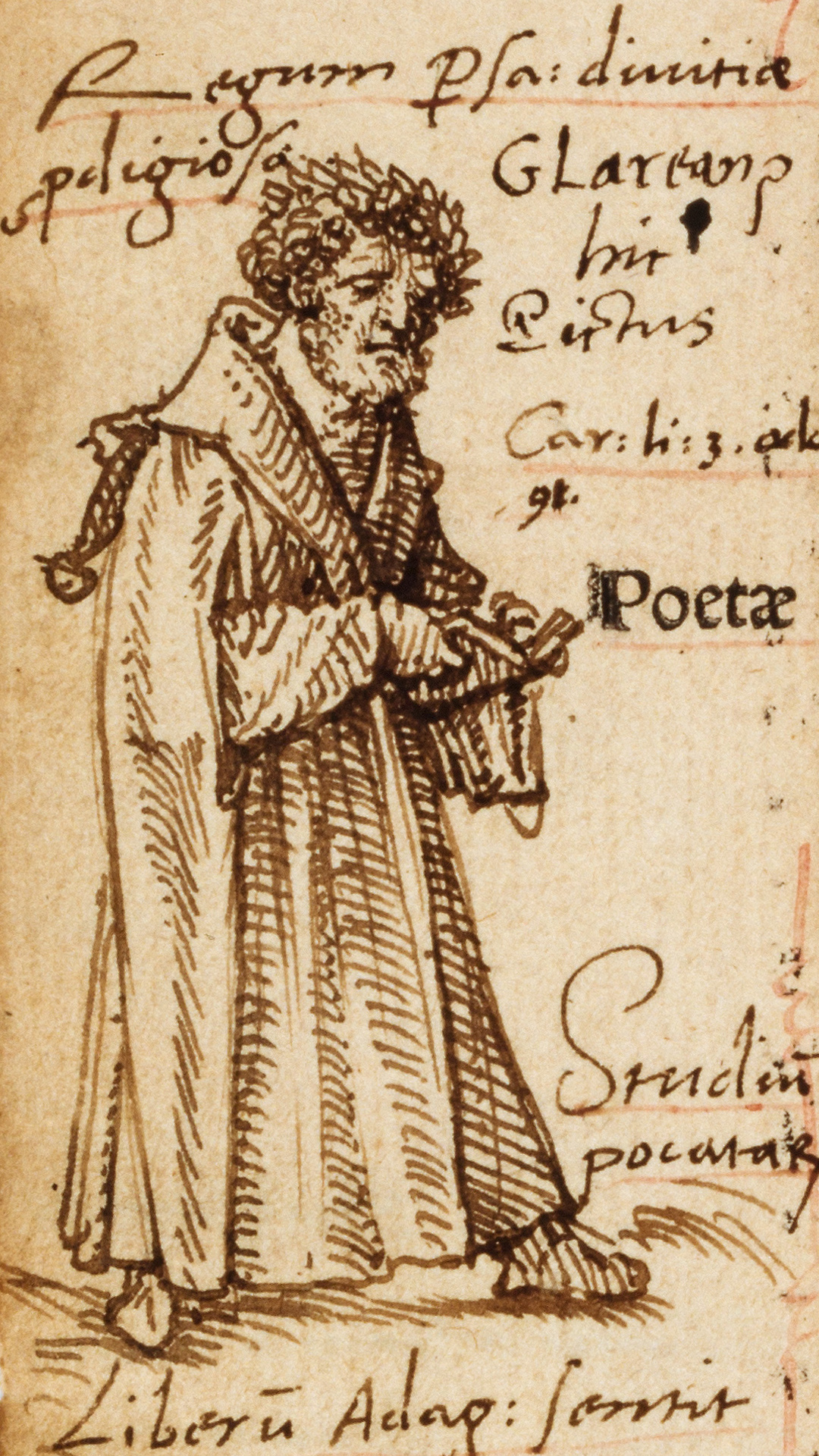
Heinrich Glarean, portrait sketch by Hans Holbein the Younger

Heinrich Glarean also styled Henricus Glareanus (born as Heinrich Loriti on 28 February or 3 June 1488 – 28 March 1563) was a Swiss music theorist, poet, humanist, philosopher and cartographer. He was born in Mollis (in the canton of Glarus, hence his name) and died in Freiburg im Breisgau.

== Biography ==
Glarean was born as Heinrich Loriti (also spelled Loritti, Loretti, Loritis, Loris, Loritz and Loritus) in Mollis in Canton Glarus to a politician. As a boy, he took care of cattle and received a good education. After a thorough early training in music, Glarean enrolled in the University of Cologne, where he studied theology, philosophy, and mathematics as well as music. It was in Cologne where he held a poem as a tribute to Emperor Maximilian I. Since 1514 he was a teacher for Greek and Latin in Basel, where he met Erasmus and the two humanists became lifelong friends. He shortly was a lecturer at the University of Pavia for a few months in 1515, but returned to Basel due to the Battle of Marignano between Switzerland and France.

In the early stages of the reformation, Glarean, like Erasmus, had considerable sympathy with Martin Luther's criticisms of church abuses and scholastic teaching methods. When the break with Rome became inevitable in 1521-1522, however, Glarean and Erasmus both remained faithful to the Church of Rome. Glarean broke off contacts with his fellow-countryman Zwingli, with whom he had been in correspondence since 1508, and with Oswald Myconius, a former schoolmate.

=== Music ===
Glarean's first publication on music, a modest volume entitled Isagoge in musicen, was printed in 1515 by Johann Froben. In it he discusses the basic elements of music; probably it was used for teaching. In late 1515 a treatise on latin poetry of him was printed by Adam Petri. But his most famous book, and one of the most famous and influential works on music theory written during the Renaissance, was the Dodecachordon, which he published in Basel in 1547. This massive work includes writings on philosophy and biography in addition to music theory, and includes no less than 120 complete compositions by composers of the preceding generation (including Josquin, Ockeghem, Obrecht, Isaac and many others). In three parts, it begins with a study of Boethius, who wrote extensively on music in the sixth century; it traces the use of the musical modes in plainsong (e.g. Gregorian chant) and monophony; and it closes with an extended study of the use of modes in polyphony.

The most significant feature of the Dodecachordon (literally, "12-stringed instrument") is Glarean's proposal that there are actually twelve modes, not eight, as had long been assumed, for instance in the works of the contemporary theorist Pietro Aron. The additional four modes included authentic and plagal forms of Aeolian (modes 9 and 10) and Ionian (modes 11 and 12) — the modes equivalent to minor and major scales, respectively. Glarean went so far as to say that the Ionian mode was the one most frequently used by composers in his day.

The influence of his work was immense. Many later theorists, including Zarlino, accepted the twelve modes, and though the distinction between plagal and authentic forms of the modes is no longer of contemporary interest (reducing the number from twelve to six), Glarean's explanation of the musical modes remains current today.

=== Geography ===
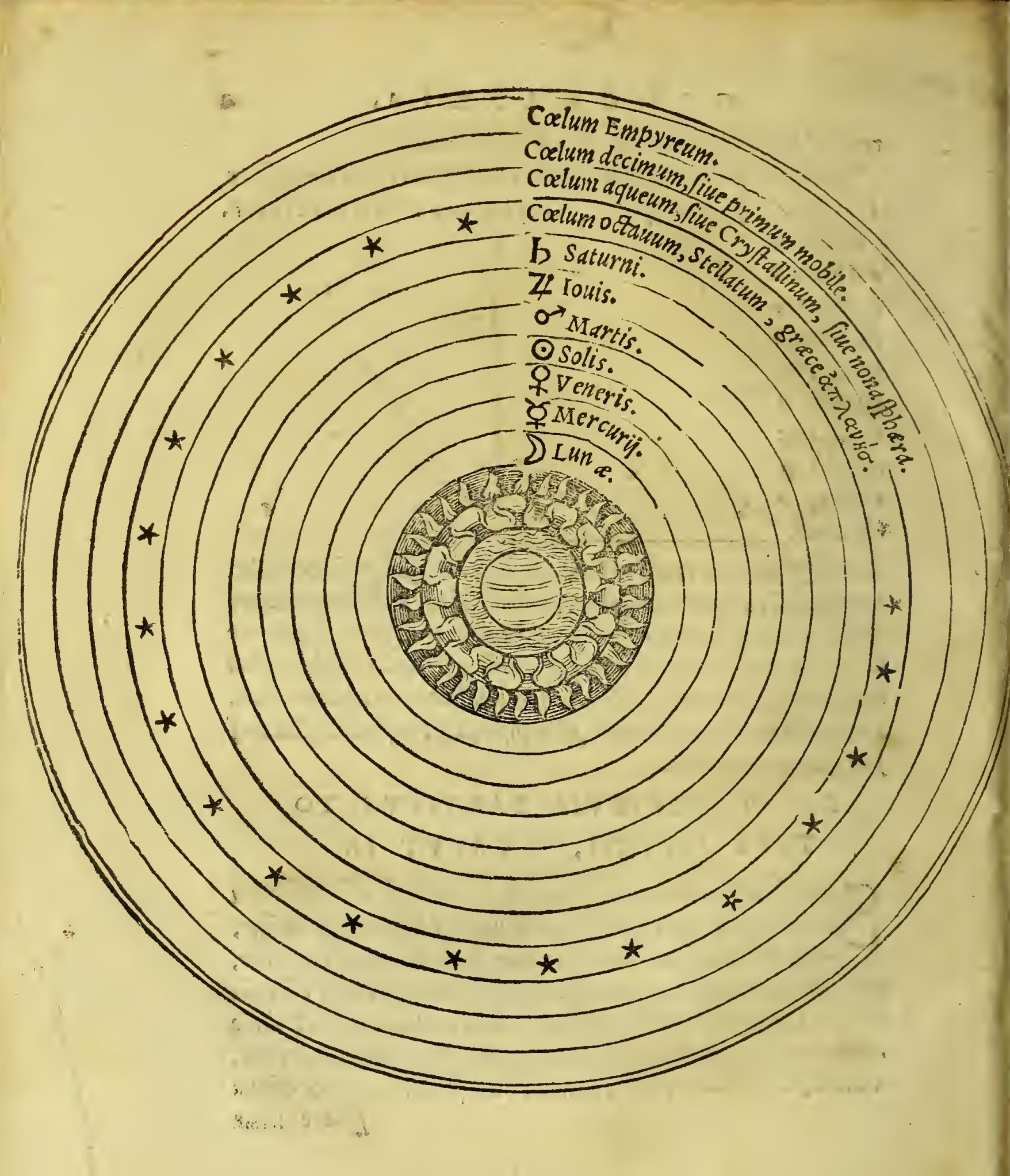
Glarean's diagram of the universe

Glarean's most important published work on geography was De Geographia Liber (Basel, 1527). This gives a representation of the universe derived from Ptolemy's system, with the spherical earth at the centre and concentric spheres surrounding it carrying the celestial bodies. Eclipses are illustrated with diagrams. Latitude and longitude are defined, and the effects of the incident angle of the sun at different latitudes on climate explained. The use of the astrolabe is described. Then follow chapters on different regions of the world, starting with Ireland (Hibernia) and ending with America, which is named along with its discovers, Columbus of Genoa, and Americus Vesputius.

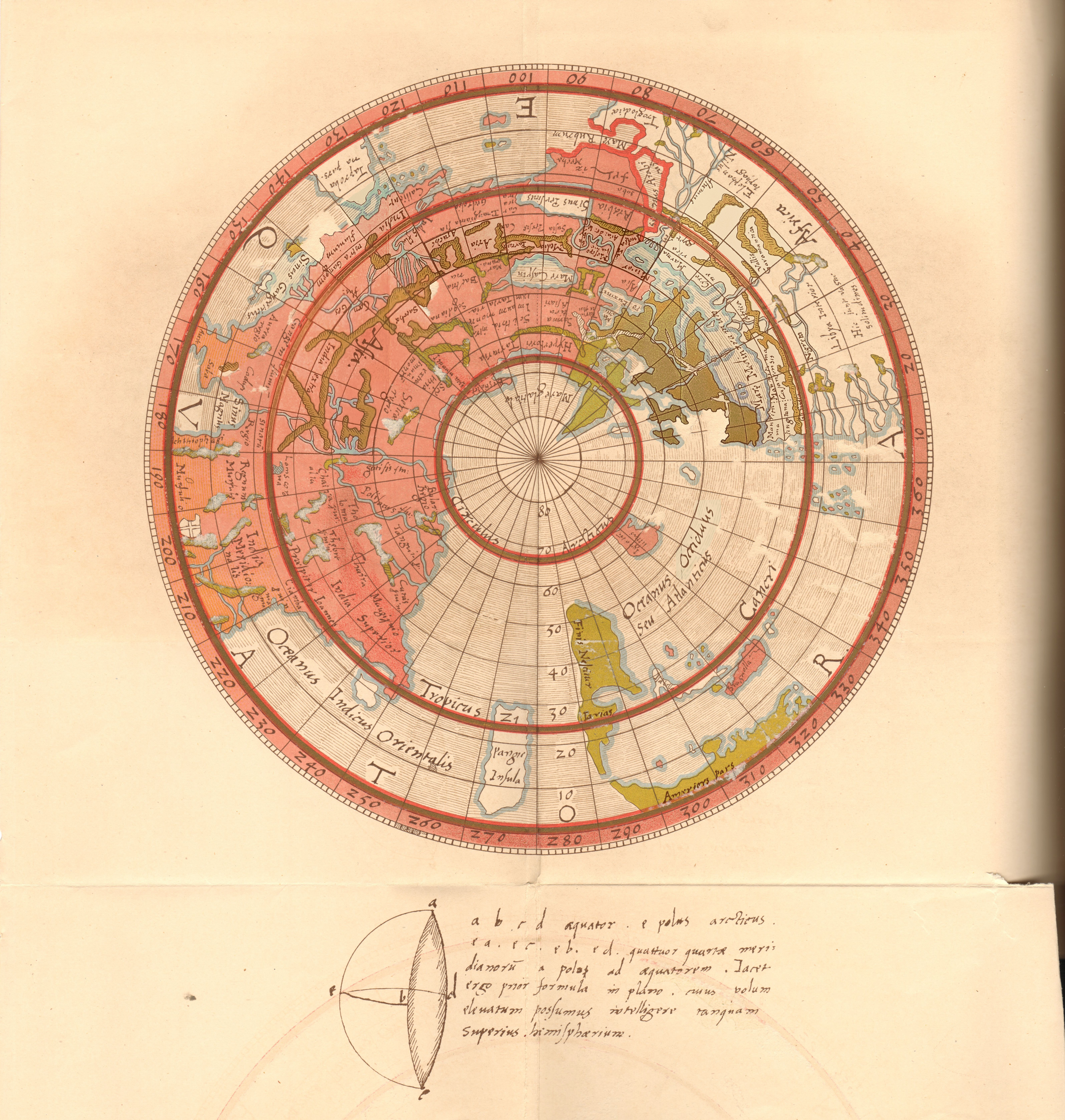
Facsimile of the Glareanus map of the northern hemisphere.

Early in the twentieth century, a manuscript of the Geographia was discovered in England. This dates from about 1510, so considerably earlier than the published book, and contains, in addition to the published text, five hand-drawn maps. Of special interest are two, of the northern and southern hemispheres, which use the Azimuthal equidistant projection. These are the earliest existing maps to use this projection, although it was described earlier by the Persian scholar al-Biruni. Charles Close described the discovery of the manuscript in 1905, and his account was published with a fasimile of one of the maps. The original manuscript and maps are now in the John Carter Brown Library. The northern hemisphere map is clearly based on the Waldseemüller world map of 1507, the first map to name America, and also one of the first to show America as a separate continent, rather than being attached to Asia.

Glarean's other work of note is the Helvetiae Descriptio, a patriotic poem on the history and people of Switzerland. This was first published in 1514, and then re-issued with a commentary by Oswald Myconius in 1519.
