= Hypolydian mode =

Church mode of medieval music theory

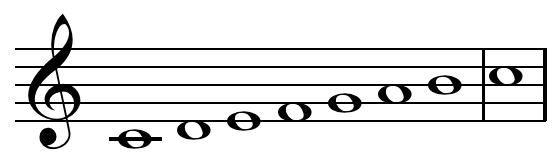
Hypolydian mode on F (only with B♮ instead of the usual B♭ ).

The introit Requiem aeternam, from which the Requiem Mass gets its name, is in Hypolydian mode (Mode 6).

The Hypolydian mode, literally meaning "below Lydian", is the common name for the sixth of the eight church modes of medieval music theory. The name is taken from Ptolemy of Alexandria's term for one of his seven tonoi, or transposition keys. This mode is the plagal counterpart of the authentic fifth mode.

In medieval theory the Hypolydian mode was described either as (1) the diatonic octave species from C to the C an octave higher, divided at the final F (C–D–E–F + F–G–A–B–C) or (2) a mode with F as final and an ambitus from the C below the final to the D above it. The third above the final, A—corresponding to the reciting tone or "tenor" of the sixth psalm tone—was regarded as having an important melodic function in this mode. The sequence of intervals was therefore divided by the final into a lower tetrachord of tone-tone-semitone, and an upper pentachord of tone-tone-tone-semitone. However, from as early as the time of Hucbald the Hypolydian mode—even more than the corresponding authentic mode, the Lydian—was characterized by the predominance of B♭ instead of B♮ as the fourth degree above the final. The melodic centering on F and A, as well as the use of B♭ instead of B♮, is illustrated in the accompanying example from the Requiem Mass introit, "Requiem aeternam".

Finer distinctions among the scale degree are sometimes made, with the D below the final called the "mediant", the lowest note, C, the "participant" (a tone functioning as an auxiliary to the mediant), the G, B, and B♭ the "conceded modulations" (subsidiary degrees), and the lowest C, the final, F, and (rarely) the D the "absolute initials".
