= Gregorian mode =

System of pitch organization in Gregorian chant

The introit Quasi modo geniti, from which Quasimodo Sunday gets its name, is in Mode 6.

A Gregorian mode (or church mode) is one of the eight systems of pitch organization used in Gregorian chant.

== History ==
The name of Pope Gregory I was attached to the variety of chant that was to become the dominant variety in medieval western and central Europe (the Archdiocese of Milan with its own rite was the sole significant exception) by the Frankish cantors reworking Roman ecclesiastical song during the Carolingian period. The theoretical framework of modes arose later to describe the tonal structure of this chant repertory, and is not necessarily applicable to the other European chant dialects (Old Roman, Mozarabic, Ambrosian, etc.).

The repertory of Western plainchant acquired its basic forms between the sixth and early ninth centuries, but there are neither theoretical sources nor notated music from this period. By the late eighth century, a system of eight modal categories, for which there was no precedent in Ancient Greek theory, came to be associated with the repertory of Gregorian chant. This system likely originated from the early Byzantine oktōēchos, as indicated by the non-Hellenistic Greek names used in the earliest Western sources from about 800.

== Tonality ==
In the traditional system of eight modes (in use mainly between the 8th and 16th centuries) there are four pairs, each pair comprising an authentic mode and a plagal mode.

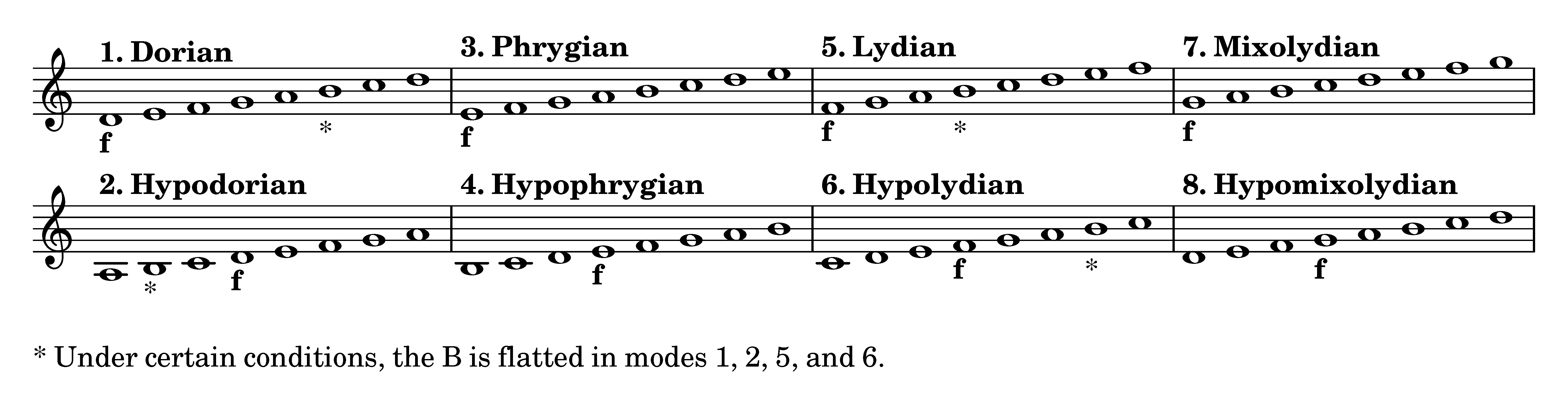
The eight Gregorian modes: f indicates 'final'

=== Authentic mode ===
The authentic modes were the odd-numbered modes 1, 3, 5, 7, and this distinction was extended to the Aeolian and Ionian modes when they were added to the original eight Gregorian modes in 1547 by Glareanus in his Dodecachordon. The final of an authentic mode is the tonic, though the range of modes 1, 3, and 7 may occasionally descend one step further. This added degree is called the "subfinal" which, since it lies a whole tone below the final, is also the "subtonium" of the mode. The range of mode 5 (Lydian) does not employ a subfinal, and so always maintains F as its lower limit. These four modes correspond to the modern modal scales starting on re (Dorian), mi (Phrygian), fa (Lydian), and sol (Mixolydian). The tenor, or dominant (corresponding to the "reciting tone" of the psalm tones), is a fifth above the final of the scale, with the exception of mode 3 (Phrygian), where it is a sixth above the final. This is because a fifth above the tonic of mode 3 is the "unstable" ti (in modern solfège), which may be flattened to ta.

The older Byzantine system still retains eight echoi (sing. ἦχος – echos), each consisting of a small family of closely related modes that, if rounded to their diatonic equivalents, would be the eight modes of Gregorian chant. However, they are numbered differently, the authentic modes being 1, 2, 3, 4. Other Eastern Christian rites use similar systems of eight modes; see Syriac usage of Octoechos and Armenian usage of Octoechos.

=== Plagal mode ===
A plagal mode (from Greek πλάγιος 'oblique, sideways, athwart') has a range that includes the octave from the fourth below the final to the fifth above. The plagal modes are the even-numbered modes 2, 4, 6 and 8, and each takes its name from the corresponding odd-numbered authentic mode with the addition of the prefix "hypo-": Hypodorian, Hypophrygian, Hypolydian, and Hypomixolydian.

The earliest definition of plagal mode is found in Hucbald's treatise De harmonica (c. 880), who specifies the range as running from the fourth below the final to the fifth above. Later writers extend this general rule to include the sixth above the final and the fifth below, except for the Hypolydian mode, which would have a diminished fifth below the final and so the fourth below, C, remained the lower limit. In addition to the range, the tenor (cofinal, or dominant, corresponding to the "reciting tone" of the psalm tones) differs. In the plagal modes, the tenor is a third lower than the tenor of the corresponding authentic mode, except in mode 8 (Hypomixolydian), where it is raised to a 4th above the finalis (a second below the tenor of the authentic mode 7) in order to avoid the "unstable" degree ti, which may be flattened (in the authentic mode 3, the tenor is similarly raised to the sixth above the finalis, and the tenor of plagal mode 4—Hypophrygian—is therefore also a fourth above the finalis).

In Byzantine modal theory (octoechos), the word "plagal" ("plagios") refers to the four lower-lying echoi, or modes. Thus plagal first mode (also known as "tone 5" in the Russian naming system) represents a somewhat more developed and widened in range version of the first mode. The plagal second mode ("tone 6" in the Russian system) has a similar relation to the second mode, and the plagal fourth mode—respectively to the fourth mode. Though there is no "plagal third mode", the mode that one would expect ("tone 7") is called the "grave tone".

=== Hierarchy of tones ===
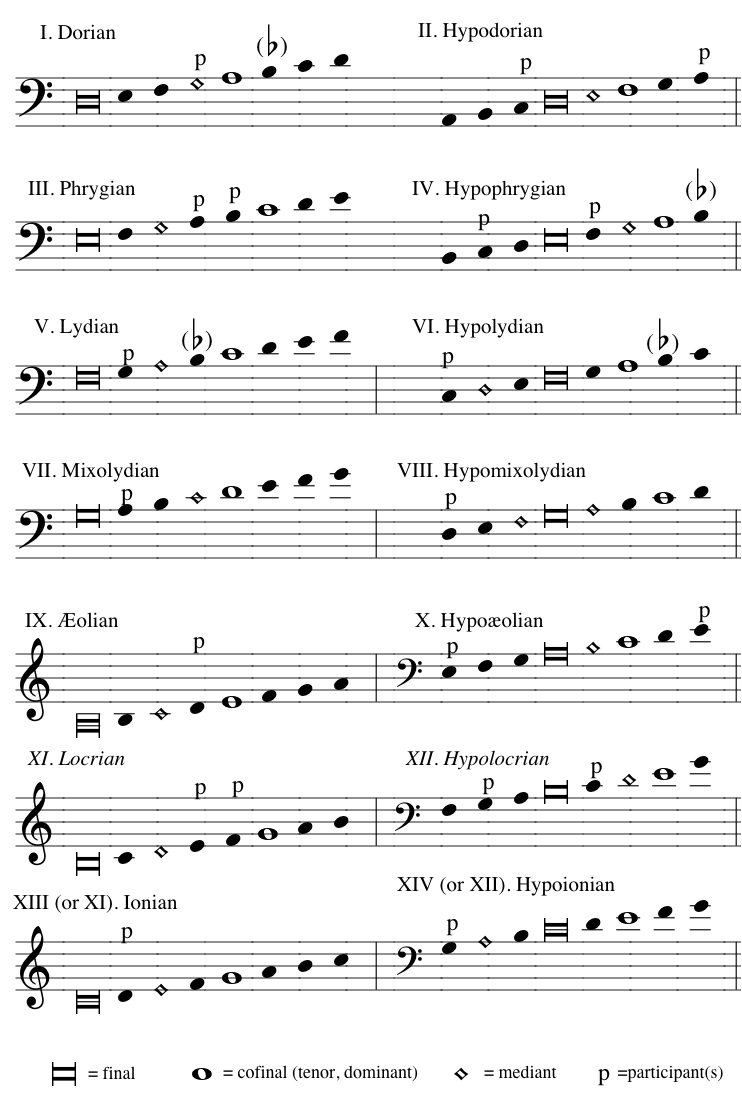
Rockstro's fourteen modes, showing the range, final, cofinal (or dominant), mediant(s), and participant(s) of each

Two characteristic notes or pitches in a modal melody are the final and cofinal (tenor, dominant, or reciting tone). These are the primary degrees (often the 1st and 5th) on which the melody is conceived and on which it most often comes to rest, in graduated stages of finality. The final is the pitch in which the chant usually ends; it may be approximately regarded as analogous (but not identical) to the tonic in the Western classical tradition. Likewise the cofinal is an additional resting point in the chant; it may be regarded as having some analogy to the more recent dominant, but its interval from the tonic is not necessarily a fifth. In addition to the final and cofinal, every mode is distinguished by scale degrees called the mediant and the participant. The mediant is named from its position—in the authentic modes—between the final and cofinal. In the authentic modes it is the third degree of the scale, unless that note should happen to be B, in which case C substitutes for it. In the plagal modes, its position is somewhat irregular. The participant is an auxiliary note, generally adjacent to the mediant in authentic modes and, in the plagal forms, coincident with the cofinal of the corresponding authentic mode (some modes have a second participant).

Given the confusion between ancient, medieval, and modern terminology, "today it is more consistent and practical to use the traditional designation of the modes with numbers one to eight".

== See also ==
- Mode (music)
- Hagiopolitan Octoechos
- Neobyzantine Octoechos

== Sources ==
- Sadie, Stanley; Tyrrell, John, eds. (2001). The New Grove Dictionary of Music and Musicians (2nd ed.). London: Macmillan. ISBN 9780195170672.
