= List of musical scales and modes =

The following is a list of musical scales and modes. Degrees are relative to the major scale.

List of musical scales and modes
Name	Image	Sound	JSID (Pitch-Class Membership)	Degrees	Intervals	Integer notation	# of pitch classes	Lower tetrachord	Upper tetrachord
15 equal temperament	15-tet scale on C.			—	—	—	15	—	—
16 equal temperament	16-tet scale on C.			—	—	—	16	—	—
17 equal temperament	17-tet scale on C.			—	—	—	17	—	—
19 equal temperament	19-tet scale on C.			—	—	—	19	—	—
21 equal temperament	21-tet scale on C.			—	—	—	21	—	—
Acoustic scale/ Lydian dominant scale	Acoustic scale on C.		2742 (101010110110)	1 2 3 ♯4 5 6 ♭7	W-W-W-H-W-H-W	(0,2,4,6,7,9,10)	7	Lydian	Minor
Aeolian mode/ natural minor scale	Aeolian on C.		2906 (101101011010)	1 2 ♭3 4 5 ♭6 ♭7	W-H-W-W-H-W-W	(0,2,3,5,7,8,10)	7	Minor	Phrygian
Algerian scale	Algerian scale on C.		2873/2880 (101100110101/ 101101000000)	1 2 ♭3 ♯4 5 ♭6 7 etc.	W-H-3H-H-H-3H-H-W-H-W	(0,2,3,6,7,8,11,12,14,15,17)	Variable	—	—
Alpha scale	—			—	—	—	15.39	—	—
Altered scale/ Super Locrian scale	Altered scale on C.		3498 (110110101010)	1 ♭2 ♭3 ♭4 ♭5 ♭6 ♭7	H-W-H-W-W-W-W	(0,1,3,4,6,8,10)	7	Locrian	Lydian
Augmented scale	Augmented scale on C.		2457 (100110011001)	1 ♭3 3 5 ♯5 7	3H-H-3H-H-3H-H	(0,3,4,7,8,11)	6	—	Harmonic
Bebop dominant scale	Bebop dominant scale on C.		2775 (101011010111)	1 2 3 4 5 6 ♭7 7	W-W-H-W-W-H-H-H	(0,2,4,5,7,9,10,11)	8	Major	Chromatic
Beta scale	—			—	—	—	18.75	—	—
Blues scale	Blues scale on C.		2418 (100101110010)	1 ♭3 4 ♭5 5 ♭7	3H-W-H-H-3H-W	(0,3,5,6,7,10)	6	Blues #1	Blues #2
Bohlen–Pierce scale	—			—	—	—	—	—	—
Chromatic scale	Chromatic scale on C.		4095 (111111111111)	1 ♯1 2 ♯2 3 4 ♯4 5 ♯5 6 ♯6 7; 7 ♭7 6 ♭6 5 ♭5 4 3 ♭3 2 ♭2 1	H-H-H-H-H-H-H-H-H-H-H-H	(0,1,2,3,4,5,6,7,8,9,10,11)	12	Chromatic	Chromatic
Dorian mode	Dorian on C.		2902 (101101010110)	1 2 ♭3 4 5 6 ♭7	W-H-W-W-W-H-W	(0,2,3,5,7,9,10)	7	Minor	Minor
Double harmonic scale	Double harmonic scale on C.		3289 (110011011001)	1 ♭2 3 4 5 ♭6 7	H-3H-H-W-H-3H-H	(0,1,4,5,7,8,11)	7	Harmonic	Harmonic
Enigmatic scale	Enigmatic scale on C.		3243 (110010101011)	1 ♭2 3 ♯4 ♯5 ♯6 7	H-3H-W-W-W-H-H	(0,1,4,6,8,10,11)	7	Blues #1	Mixolydian Blues
Euler–Fokker genus	Euler-Fokker genus 337 on C.			—	—	—	6	—	—
Gamma scale	—			—	—	—	34.29	—	—
"Gypsy" scale	"Gypsy" [sic] scale on C.		2874 (101100111010)	1 2 ♭3 ♯4 5 ♭6 ♭7	W-H-3H-H-H-W-W	(0,2,3,6,7,8,10)	7	Gypsy	Phrygian
Half diminished scale	Half diminished scale on C.		2922 (101101101010)	1 2 ♭3 4 ♭5 ♭6 ♭7	W-H-W-H-W-W-W	(0,2,3,5,6,8,10)	7	Minor	Lydian
Harmonic major scale	Harmonic major scale on C.		2777 (101011011001)	1 2 3 4 5 ♭6 7	W-W-H-W-H-3H-H	(0,2,4,5,7,8,11)	7	Major	Harmonic
Harmonic minor scale	Harmonic minor scale on C.		2905 (101101011001)	1 2 ♭3 4 5 ♭6 (♮)7	W-H-W-W-H-3H-H	(0,2,3,5,7,8,11)	7	Minor	Harmonic
Harmonic scale	Harmonic scale chromatic on C.			—	—	—	12	—	—
Hirajōshi scale	Hirajoshi scale on C.		2225 (100010110001)	1 3 ♯4 5 7	2W-W-H-2W-H	(0,4,6,7,11)	5	—	—
Hungarian "Gypsy" scale/ Hungarian minor scale	Hungarian "Gypsy"[sic] scale on C.		2873 (101100111001)	1 2 ♭3 ♯4 5 ♭6 7	W-H-3H-H-H-3H-H	(0,2,3,6,7,8,11)	7	Gypsy	Harmonic
Hungarian major scale	Hungarian major scale on C.		2486 (100110110110)	1 ♯2 3 ♯4 5 6 ♭7	3H-H-W-H-W-H-W	(0,3,4,6,7,9,10)	7	—	Minor
In scale	Miyako-bushi scale on D, equivalent to in scale on D, with brackets on fourths.		3160 (110001011000)	1 ♭2 4 5 ♭6	H-2W-W-H-2W	(0,1,5,7,8)	5	—	—
Insen scale	Insen scale on C.		3154 (110001010010)	1 ♭2 4 5 ♭7	H-2W-W-3H-W	(0,1,5,7,10)	5	—	—
Ionian mode/ major scale	Ionian on C.		2773 (101011010101)	1 2 3 4 5 6 7	W-W-H-W-W-W-H	(0,2,4,5,7,9,11)	7	Major	Major
Istrian scale	Istrian mode on C.		3504 (110110110000)	1 ♭2 ♭3 ♭4 ♭5 5	H-W-H-W-H-5H	(0,1,3,4,6,7)	6	Locrian	—
Iwato scale	Iwato scale on C.		3170 (110001100010)	1 ♭2 4 ♭5 ♭7	H-2W-H-2W-W	(0,1,5,6,10)	5	—	—
Locrian mode	Locrian on C.		3434 (110101101010)	1 ♭2 ♭3 4 ♭5 ♭6 ♭7	H-W-W-H-W-W-W	(0,1,3,5,6,8,10)	7	Phrygian	Lydian
Locrian ♮6	—	—	3430 (110101100110)	1 ♭2 ♭3 4 ♭5 6 ♭7	H-W-W-H-3H-H-W	(0,1,3,5,6,9,10)	7	Phrygian	–
Lydian augmented scale	Lydian augmented scale on C.		2733 (101010101101)	1 2 3 ♯4 ♯5 6 7	W-W-W-W-H-W-H	(0,2,4,6,8,9,11)	7	Lydian	Locrian
Lydian diminished scale	Lydian diminished on C.	—	2869 (101100110101)	1 2 ♭3 ♯4 5 6 7	W-H-3H-H-W-W-H	(0,2,3,6,7,9,11)	7	Gypsy	Major
Lydian mode	Lydian on C.		2741 (101010110101)	1 2 3 ♯4 5 6 7	W-W-W-H-W-W-H	(0,2,4,6,7,9,11)	7	Lydian	Major
Major bebop scale	Major bebop scale on C.		2781 (101011011101)	1 2 3 4 5 (♯5/♭6) 6 7	W-W-H-W-(H-H)-W-H	(0,2,4,5,7,(8),9,11)	7(8)	Major	Locrian
Major Locrian scale	Major Locrian scale C.		2794 (101011101010)	1 2 3 4 ♭5 ♭6 ♭7	W-W-H-H-W-W-W	(0,2,4,5,6,8,10)	7	Major	Lydian
Major pentatonic scale	Major pentatonic scale on C.		2708 (101010010100)	1 2 3 5 6	W-W-3H-W-3H	(0,2,4,7,9)	5	—	—
Melodic minor scale	The A melodic minor scale, ascending and descending, on A.		2901\2906 (101101010101\ 101101011010)	1 2 ♭3 4 5 ♮6 ♮7 8 ♭7 ♭6 5 4 ♭3 2 1	W-H-W-W-W-W-H (ascending) W-W-H-W-W-H-W (descending)	(0,2,3,5,7,9,11) (ascending) (12,10,8,7,5,3,2) (descending)	9	Minor (ascending) Major (descending)	Major (ascending) Minor (descending)
Melodic minor scale (ascending)/ Hawaiian scale	Melodic minor scale ascending on A.		2901 (101101010101)	1 2 ♭3 4 5 6 7	W-H-W-W-W-W-H	(0,2,3,5,7,9,11)	7	Minor	Major
Minor pentatonic scale	Minor pentatonic scale on A.		2386 (100101010010)	1 ♭3 4 5 ♭7	3H-W-W-3H-W	(0,3,5,7,10)	5	—	—
Mixolydian mode/ Adonai malakh mode	Mixolydian on C.		2774 (101011010110)	1 2 3 4 5 6 ♭7	W-W-H-W-W-H-W	(0,2,4,5,7,9,10)	7	Major	Minor
Neapolitan major scale	Neapolitan major scale on C.		3413 (110101010101)	1 ♭2 ♭3 4 5 6 7	H-W-W-W-W-W-H	(0,1,3,5,7,9,11)	7	Phrygian	Major
Neapolitan minor scale	Neapolitan minor scale on C.		3417 (110101011001)	1 ♭2 ♭3 4 5 ♭6 7	H-W-W-W-H-3H-H	(0,1,3,5,7,8,11)	7	Phrygian	Harmonic
Non-Pythagorean scale	—			—	—	—	—	—	—
Octatonic scale	Octatonic scales on C.		2925 (101101101101) 3510 (110110110110)	1 2 ♭3 4 ♭5 ♭6 6 7 1 ♭2 ♭3 3 ♯4 5 6 ♭7	W-H-W-H-W-H-W-H H-W-H-W-H-W-H-W	(0,2,3,5,6,8,9,11) (0,1,3,4,6,7,9,10)	8	Minor Lydian	Lydian Minor
Pelog	Pelog approximated in Western notation.			—	—	—	—	—	—
Persian scale	Persian scale on C.		3305 (110011101001)	1 ♭2 3 4 ♭5 ♭6 7	H-3H-H-H-W-3H-H	(0,1,4,5,6,8,11)	7	Harmonic	—
Phrygian dominant scale	Phrygian dominant on C.		3290 (110011011010)	1 ♭2 3 4 5 ♭6 ♭7	H-3H-H-W-H-W-W	(0,1,4,5,7,8,10)	7	Lydian	Phrygian
Phrygian mode	Phrygian on C.		3418 (110101011010)	1 ♭2 ♭3 4 5 ♭6 ♭7	H-W-W-W-H-W-W	(0,1,3,5,7,8,10)	7	Phrygian	Phrygian
Prometheus scale	Prometheus scale on C.		2726 (101010100110)	1 2 3 ♯4 6 ♭7	W-W-W-3H-H-W	(0,2,4,6,9,10)	6	Harmonic	—
Quarter tone scale	Quarter tone scale C.			1 1 ♯1 1 2 2 ♯2 2 3 3 4 4 ♯4 4 5 5 ♯5 5 6 6 ♯6 6 7 7 8 7 7 ♭7 7 6 6 ♭6 6 5 5 ♭5 5 4 4 3 3 ♭3 3 2 2 ♭2 2 1	Q-Q-Q-Q-Q-Q-Q-Q-Q-Q-Q-Q-Q-Q-Q-Q-Q-Q-Q-Q-Q-Q-Q-Q	(0,1/2,1,3/2,2,5/2,3, 7/2,4,9/2,5,11/2,6, 13/2,7,15/2,8,17/2,9, 19/2,10,21/2,11,23/2)	24	—	—
Scale of harmonics	Scale of harmonics C.		2516 (100111010100)	1 ♭3 3 4 5 6	3H-H-H-W-W-3H	(0,3,4,5,7,9)	6	—	—
Slendro	Slendro on C compared to a whole tone scale on C.	or		—	—	—	5	—	—
Tritone scale	Tritone scale on C.		3250 (110010110010)	1 ♭2 3 ♭5 5 ♭7	H-3H-W-H-3H-W	(0,1,4,6,7,10)	6	—	—
Two-semitone tritone scale	Two-semitone tritone scale on C.		3640 (111000111000)	1 ♭2 ♮2 ♯4 5 ♭6	H-H-2W-H-H-2W	(0,1,2,6,7,8)	6	—	—
Ukrainian Dorian scale	Ukrainian Dorian mode on C.		2870 (101100110110)	1 2 ♭3 ♯4 5 6 ♭7	W-H-3H-H-W-H-W	(0,2,3,6,7,9,10)	7	Gypsy	Minor
Vietnamese scale of harmonics	Vietnamese scale of harmonics on C.			1 3 ♭3 ♮3 4 5	5Q-Q-H-H-W	(0,5/2,3,4,5,7)	6	—	—
Whole tone scale	Whole tone scale on C.		2730 (101010101010)	1 2 3 ♯4 ♯5 ♯6	W-W-W-W-W-W	(0,2,4,6,8,10)	6	Lydian	Lydian
Yo scale	Min'yō scale on D, equivalent to yo scale on C, with brackets on fourths.		2644 (101001010100)	1 2 4 5 6	W-3H-W-W-3H	(0,2,5,7,9)	5	—	—

Tetrachords	Semitones	Letters
Blues #1	3 2 1	3H-W-H
Blues #2	1 3 2	H-3H-W
Chromatic	1 1 1	H-H-H
Chromatic (Greek)	1 1 3	H-H-3H
Diminished/Locrian	1 2 1	H-W-H
Gypsy	2 1 3	W-H-3H
Harmonic	1 3 1	H-3H-H
Lydian/Whole tone	2 2 2	W-W-W
Major/Dominant	2 2 1	W-W-H
Minor/Dorian	2 1 2	W-H-W
Mixolydian Blues	2 1 1	W-H-H
Phrygian	1 2 2	H-W-W

== See also ==
- Bebop scale
- Chord-scale system
- Flamenco mode
- Heptatonic scale
- Hexany
- Jazz scale
- List of chord progressions
- List of chords
- List of musical intervals
- List of pitch intervals
- Arabian maqam
- Modes of limited transposition
- Symmetric scale
- Synthetic modes
- Tetrachord
- Heptachord
