= Anhemitonic scale =

Musical scale containing no semitones

Min'yō scale on D, equivalent to yo scale on C, an anhemitonic scale
Miyako-bushi scale on D, equivalent to in scale on D, a hemitonic scale

Musicology commonly classifies scales as either hemitonic or anhemitonic. Hemitonic scales contain one or more semitones, while anhemitonic scales do not contain semitones. For example, in traditional Japanese music, the anhemitonic yo scale is contrasted with the hemitonic in scale. The simplest and most commonly used scale in the world is the atritonic anhemitonic "major" pentatonic scale. The whole tone scale is also anhemitonic.

Hungarian minor scale on C, a cohemitonic scale.

A special subclass of the hemitonic scales is the cohemitonic scales. Cohemitonic scales contain two or more semitones (making them hemitonic) such that two or more of the semitones appear consecutively in scale order. For example, the Hungarian minor scale in C includes F♯, G, and A♭ in that order, with a semitone between F♯ and G, and then a semitone between G and A♭.

Octatonic scales on C, hemitonic but ancohemitonic

Ancohemitonic scales, in contrast, either contain no semitones (and thus are anhemitonic), or contain semitones (being hemitonic) where none of the semitones appear consecutively in scale order. Some authors, however, do not include anhemitonic scales in their definition of ancohemitonic scales. Examples of ancohemitonic scales are numerous, as ancohemitonia is favored over cohemitonia in the world's musics: diatonic scale, melodic major/melodic minor, harmonic major scale, harmonic minor scale, Hungarian major scale, Romanian major scale, and the so-called octatonic scale.

Hemitonia is also quantified by the number of semitones present. Unhemitonic scales have only one semitone; dihemitonic scales have 2 semitones; trihemitonic scales have 3 semitones, etc. In the same way that an anhemitonic scale is less dissonant than a hemitonic scale, an unhemitonic scale is less dissonant than a dihemitonic scale.

The qualification of cohemitonia versus ancohemitonia combines with the cardinality of semitones, giving terms like: dicohemitonic, triancohemitonic, and so forth. An ancohemitonic scale is less dissonant than a cohemitonic scale, the count of their semitones being equal. In general, the number of semitones is more important to the perception of dissonance than the adjacency (or lack thereof) of any pair of them. Additional adjacency between semitones (once adjacency is present) does not necessarily increase the dissonance, the count of semitones again being equal.

Related to these semitone classifications are tritonic and atritonic scales. Tritonic scales contain one or more tritones, while atritonic scales do not contain tritones. A special monotonic relationship exists between semitones and tritones as scales are built by projection, q.v. below.

The harmonic relationship of all these categories comes from the perception that semitones and tritones are the severest of dissonances, and that avoiding them is often desirable. The most-used scales across the planet are anhemitonic. Of the remaining hemitonic scales, the ones most used are ancohemitonic.

== Quantification of hemitonia and its relationship to ancohemitonia ==
Most of the world's music is anhemitonic, perhaps 90%. Of that other hemitonic portion, perhaps 90% is unhemitonic, predominating in chords of only 1 semitone, all of which are ancohemitonic by definition. Of the remaining 10%, perhaps 90% are dihemitonic, predominating in chords of no more than 2 semitones. The same applies to chords of 3 semitones. In both later cases, however, there is a distinct preference for ancohemitonia, as the lack of adjacency of any two semitones goes a long way towards softening the increasing dissonance.

The following table plots sonority size (downwards on the left) against semitone count (to the right) plus the quality of ancohemitonia (denoted with letter A) versus cohemitonia (denoted with letter C). In general, ancohemitonic combinations are fewer for a given chord or scale size, but used much more frequently so that their names are well known.

Sonority		Semitone counts										
Notes	Count	0	1	2	2A	2C	3	3A	3C	>=4	>=4A	>=4C
1	1	1	0	0	0	0	0	0	0	0	0	0
2	6	5	1	0	0	0	0	0	0	0	0	0
3	19	10	8	1	0	1	0	0	0	0	0	0
4	43	10	21	11	4	7	1	0	1	0	0	0
5	66	3	20	30	15	15	12	0	12	1	0	1
6	80	1	5	26	16	10	34	4	30	14	0	14
7	66	0	0	3	2	1	20	4	16	43	0	43
8	43	0	0	0	0	0	0	0	0	43	1	42
9	19	0	0	0	0	0	0	0	0	19	0	19
10	6	0	0	0	0	0	0	0	0	6	0	6
11	1	0	0	0	0	0	0	0	0	1	0	1
12	1	0	0	0	0	0	0	0	0	1	0	1
TOTALS	351	30	55	71	37	34	67	8	59	128	1	127

Column "0" represents the most commonly used chords., avoiding intervals of M7 and chromatic 9ths and such combinations of 4th, chromatic 5ths, and 6th to produce semitones. Column 1 represents chords that barely use the harmonic degrees that column "0" avoids. Column 2, however, represents sounds far more intractable.

Column 0, row 5 are the full but pleasant chords: 9th, 6/9, and 9alt5 with no 7. Column "0", row "6", is the unique whole tone scale. Column "2A", row "7", a local minimum, refers to the diatonic scale and melodic major/melodic minor scales. Ancohemitonia, inter alii, probably makes these scales popular. Column "2C", row "7", another local minimum, refers to the Neapolitan major scale, which is cohemitonic and somewhat less common but still popular enough to bear a name. Column "3A", row "7", another local minimum, represents the harmonic major scale and its involution harmonic minor scale, and the Hungarian major scale and its involution Romanian major scale. Column "3A", row "6", are the hexatonic analogs to these four familiar scales, one of which being the Augmented scale, and another the analog of the Octatonic scale - which itself appears, alone and solitary, at Column ">=4A". row "8". Column "2A", row "4", another minimum, represents a few frankly dissonant, yet strangely resonant harmonic combinations: mM9 with no 5, 11♭9, dom13♭9, and M7♯11.

Note, too, that in the highest cardinality row for each column before the terminal zeros begin, the sonority counts are small, except for row "7" and the "3" columns of all sorts. This explosion of hemitonic possibility associated with note cardinality 7 (and above) possibly marks the lower bound for the entity called "scale" (in contrast to "chord").

As shown in the table, anhemitonia is a property of the domain of note sets cardinality 2 through 6, while ancohemitonia is a property of the domain of note sets cardinality 4 through 8 (3 through 8 for improper ancohemitonia including unhemitonia as well). This places anhemitonia generally in the range of "chords" and ancohemitonia generally in the range of "scales".

== Example: hemitonia and tritonia of the perfect-fifth projection ==
The interrelationship of semitones, tritones, and increasing note count can be demonstrated by taking five consecutive pitches from the circle of fifths; starting on C, these are C, G, D, A, and E. Transposing the pitches to fit into one octave rearranges the pitches into the major pentatonic scale: C, D, E, G, A. This scale is anhemitonic, having no semitones; it is atritonic, having no tritones.

In addition, this is the maximal number of notes taken consecutively from the circle of fifths for which is it still possible to avoid a semitone.

Adding another note from the circle of fifths gives the major hexatonic scale: C D E G A B. This scale is hemitonic, having a semitone between B and C; it is atritonic, having no tritones. In addition, this is the maximal number of notes taken consecutively from the circle of fifths for which is it still possible to avoid a tritone.

Adding still another note from the circle of fifths gives the major heptatonic scale: C D E F G A B (when the fifth is added from below the tonic). This scale is strictly ancohemitonic, having 2 semitones but not consecutively; it is tritonic, having a tritone between F and B. Past this point in the projection series, no new intervals are added to the Interval vector analysis of the scale, but cohemitonia results.

P7 projection/major heptatonic on C

Adding still another note from the circle of fifths gives the major octatonic scale: C D E F F♯ G A B (when the fifth is added from above the top note in the series--B in this case). This scale is cohemitonic, having 3 semitones together at E F F♯ G, and tritonic as well.

Similar behavior is seen across all scales generally, that more notes in a scale tend cumulatively to add dissonant intervals (specifically: hemitonia and tritonia in no particular order) and cohemitonia not already present. While also true that more notes in a scale tend to allow more and varied intervals in the interval vector, there might be said to be a point of diminishing returns, when qualified against the also increasing dissonance, hemitonia, tritonia and cohemitonia. It is near these points where most popular scales lie.

== Cohemitonic and hemitonic scales ==
Though less used than ancohemitonic scales, the cohemitonic scales have an interesting property. The sequence of two (or more) consecutive halfsteps in a scale presents the opportunity to "split" the scale by placing the tonic note of the scale on the middle note of the halfstep span. This allows a leading tone from below resolving upwards, as well as a descending flat-supertonic upper neighbor, both converging on the tonic. The split turns a weakness - dissonance of cohemitonia - to a strength: contrapuntal convergence on the tonic. It is very common that a cohemitonic (or even hemitonic) scale (e.g.: Hungarian minor { C D E♭ F♯ G A♭ B }) be displaced preferentially to a mode where the halfstep span is split (e.cont.: Double harmonic scale { G A♭ B C D E♭ F♯ }), and by which name we more commonly know the same circular series of intervals. Cohemitonic scales with multiple halfstep spans present the additional possibility of modulating between tonics each furnished with both upper and lower neighbors.

== Modes of heptatonic scales and the key signature system ==
Key signature A major / F♯ minor, an ancohemitonic heptatonic scale.

Western music's system of key signature is based upon the assumption of a heptatonic scale of 7 notes, such that there are never more than 7 accidentals present in a valid key signature. The global preference for anhemitonic scales combines with this basis to highlight the 6 ancohemitonic heptatonic scales, most of which are common in romantic music, and of which most Romantic music is composed:

- Diatonic scale
- Melodic major/melodic minor
- Harmonic major scale
- Harmonic minor scale
- Hungarian major scale
- Romanian major scale

These cohemitonic scales are less common:

- Double harmonic major scale
- Neapolitan major scale
- Neapolitan minor scale
- Ionian ♭5 scale
- Persian scale
- Locrian ♯7 scale

Adhering to the definition of heptatonic scales, these all possess 7 modes each, and are suitable for use in modal mutation. They appear in the table above in Row "7", Columns "2A" and "3A".

=== Table of key signatures ===
The following lists the key signatures for all possible untransposed modes of the aforementioned heptatonic scales using the note C as the tonic.

Base scale	Accidentals	Mode name
Diatonic	F♯	Lydian
Diatonic		Ionian
Diatonic	B♭	Mixolydian
Diatonic	B♭, E♭	Dorian
Diatonic	B♭, E♭, A♭	Aeolian
Diatonic	B♭, E♭, A♭, D♭	Phrygian
Diatonic	B♭, E♭, A♭, D♭, G♭	Locrian
Base scale	Accidentals	Mode name
Melodic	F♯, G♯	Lydian Augmented
Melodic	F♯, B♭	Acoustic, Lydian Dominant
Melodic	E♭	Melodic minor (ascending), Jazz minor
Melodic	B♭, A♭	Melodic Major (descending), Aeolian Dominant, Mixolydian ♭6
Melodic	B♭, E♭, D♭	Dorian ♭2
Melodic	B♭, E♭, A♭, G♭	Half Diminished, Locrian ♮2, Semilocrian
Melodic	B♭, E♭, A♭, D♭, G♭, F♭	Superlocrian, Altered
Base scale	Accidentals	Mode name
Harmonic major	F♯, G♯, D♯	Lydian Augmented ♯2
Harmonic major	F♯, E♭	Lydian Diminished
Harmonic major	A♭	Harmonic Major
Harmonic major	B♭, D♭	Phrygian Dominant ♮6
Harmonic major	B♭, E♭, G♭	Diminished Dorian
Harmonic major	B♭, E♭, A♭, D♭, F♭	Superphrygian
Harmonic major	E♭, A♭, D♭, G♭, B	Locrian Diminished
Base scale	Accidentals	Mode name
Harmonic minor	F♯, D♯	Lydian ♯2
Harmonic minor	G♯	Ionian Augmented
Harmonic minor	F♯, B♭, E♭	Ukrainian Dorian
Harmonic minor	E♭, A♭	Harmonic Minor
Harmonic minor	B♭, A♭, D♭	Phrygian Dominant
Harmonic minor	B♭, E♭, D♭, G♭	Locrian ♮6
Harmonic minor	E♭, A♭, D♭, G♭, F♭, B	Ultralocrian
Base scale	Accidentals	Mode name
Hungarian major	F♯, G♯, E♯	Lydian Augmented ♯3
Hungarian major	F♯, D♯, B♭	Hungarian Major
Hungarian major	G♯, E♭	Jazz Minor ♯5
Hungarian major	F♯, B♭, E♭, D♭	Ukrainian Dorian ♭9
Hungarian major	E♭, A♭, G♭	Harmonic Minor ♭5
Hungarian major	B♭, E♭, D♭, G♭, F♭	Altered Dominant ♮6
Hungarian major	E♭, D♭, G♭, F♭, B, A	Ultralocrian 6
Base scale	Accidentals	Mode name
Romanian major	F♯, G♯, D♯, E♯	Super Lydian Augmented ♮6
Romanian major	F♯, G♯, E♭	Lydian Augmented ♭3
Romanian major	F♯, B♭, D♭	Romanian Major
Romanian major	E♭, G♭	Jazz Minor ♭5
Romanian major	B♭, E♭, D♭, F♭	Dorian ♭9 ♭11
Romanian major	E♭, A♭, G♭, B	Semilocrian 7
Romanian major	B♭, E♭, D♭, G♭, F♭, A	Altered Dominant 6
Base scale	Accidentals	Mode name
Hungarian minor	F♯, D♯, A♯	Lydian ♯2 ♯6
Hungarian minor	G♯, D♯	Ionian Augmented ♯2
Hungarian minor	F♯, E♭, A♭	Hungarian Minor
Hungarian minor	A♭, D♭	Double harmonic
Hungarian minor	B♭, D♭, G♭	Oriental
Hungarian minor	E♭, A♭, D♭, F♭, B	Ultraphrygian
Hungarian minor	A♭, D♭, G♭, B, E	Locrian Diminished 3
Base scale	Accidentals	Mode name
Neapolitan major	F♯, G♯, A♯	Leading Whole-Tone
Neapolitan major	F♯, G♯, B♭	Lydian Augmented Dominant
Neapolitan major	F♯, B♭, A♭	Lydian Minor
Neapolitan major	E♭, D♭	Neapolitan Major
Neapolitan major	B♭, A♭, G♭	Locrian Major
Neapolitan major	B♭, E♭, A♭, G♭, F♭	Altered ♮2
Neapolitan major	B♭, A♭, D♭, G♭, F♭, E	Altered 3
Base scale	Accidentals	Mode name
Neapolitan minor	F♯, A♯	Lydian ♯6
Neapolitan minor	D♯	Ionian ♯2
Neapolitan minor	G♯, B♭	Mixolydian Augmented
Neapolitan minor	F♯, B♭, E♭, A♭	Hungarian Gypsy
Neapolitan minor	E♭, A♭, D♭	Neapolitan Minor
Neapolitan minor	B♭, A♭, D♭, G♭	Locrian Dominant
Neapolitan minor	A♭, D♭, G♭, F♭, B, E	Ultralocrian 3
Base scale	Accidentals	Mode name
Ionian ♭5	F♯, G♯, D♯, A♯, E♯	Super Lydian Augmented
Ionian ♭5	F♯, D♭	Lydian ♭2
Ionian ♭5	G♭	Ionian ♭5
Ionian ♭5	B♭, E♭, F♭	Dorian ♭4
Ionian ♭5	E♭, A♭, B	Aeolian 7
Ionian ♭5	B♭, A♭, D♭, E	Phrygian 3
Ionian ♭5	B♭, E♭, D♭, G♭, A	Locrian 6
Base scale	Accidentals	Mode name
Persian	F♯, A♯, E♯	Lydian ♯6 ♯3
Persian	D♯, A♯	Ionian ♯2 ♯6
Persian	G♯, D♯, B♭	Mixolydian Augmented ♯2
Persian	F♯, E♭, A♭, D♭	Neapolitan Minor ♯4
Persian	A♭, D♭, G♭	Persian
Persian	A♭, D♭, F♭, B, E	Ultraphrygian 3
Persian	D♭, G♭, B, E, A	Altered Altered ♮4
Base scale	Accidentals	Mode name
Locrian ♮7	F♯, E♯	Lydian ♯3
Locrian ♮7	A♯	Ionian ♯6
Locrian ♮7	D♯, B♭	Mixolydian ♯2
Locrian ♮7	G♯, B♭, E♭	Dorian Augmented
Locrian ♮7	F♯, B♭, E♭, A♭, D♭	Phrygian ♯4
Locrian ♮7	E♭, A♭, D♭, G♭	Locrian ♮7
Locrian ♮7	D♭, G♭, F♭, B, E, A	Altered Altered

== Common citation in theories ==
- Dimitri Tymoczko, in A Geometry of Music: Harmony and Counterpoint in the Extended Common Practice (ISBN 978-0195336672), includes hemitonia in calculation formulas for contrapuntal smoothness and harmonic force transfer.
- Brett Willmott, in Mel Bays Complete Book of Harmony Theory and Voicing (ISBN 978-1562229948), restricts the scope of his guitar chord voicing to ancohemitonic tetrads.
- Michael Keith, in From Polychords to Polya : Adventures in Musical Combinatorics (ISBN 978-0963009708), draws his list of basic harmonies as anhemitonic sonorities.

== Miscellanea ==
- All heptatonic (except for 7EDO temperament, so called "neutral scale", used in gamelan music and some folk musical styles of Angola) and larger scales are hemitonic (ditonic or better) and tritonic. All pitch class sets of seven notes contain 1-3 tritones and 3-6 semitones, as can be seen in their interval vectors on List of set classes.
- All octatonic scales save one ("the octatonic" or Diminished scale) are cohemitonic.
- All enneatonic and larger scales are cohemitonic.
- All sonorities with 5 or more semitones are cohemitonic.
- The set complement of a cohemitonic scale is often an ancohemitonic scale, and vice versa.
- Unhemitonic scales never have more than 6 notes, and are always ancohemitonic.
- Dihemitonic and trihemitonic scales never have more than 7 notes.
- Tetrahemitonic and pentahemitonic scales never have more than 8 notes.
- Hexahemitonic and heptahemitonic scales never have more than 9 notes.
- Octahemitonic and enneahemitonic scales never have more than 10 notes.
- There is no 12ET scale with exactly 11 halfsteps.
