= List of Greek and Latin roots in English/T =

Lists of Greek and Latin roots in English beginning with other letters:
- A
- B
- C
- D
- E
- F
- G
- H
- I
- J
- K
- L
- M
- N
- O
- P
- Q
- R
- S
- T
- U
- V
- X
- Z

== T ==
Root	Meaning in English	Origin language	Etymology (root origin)	English examples
tac-, -tic-	be silent	Latin	tacere, tacitus	reticent, reticence, tacit, taciturn
tach-	swift	Greek	ταχύς (takhús), τάχος (tákhos)	tachometer, tachycardia, tachyrhythmia, tachytelic
taeni-	ribbon	Greek	τείνειν (teínein), ταινία (tainía), ταινίδιον (tainídion)	diplotene, leptotene, pachytene, taenia, taenidia, taenidium, taeniodont, Taeniolabis, zygotene
tag-, tax- (ΤΑΓ)	arrange, order	Greek	τάσσειν (tássein), τακτός (taktós), τακτικός (taktikós), τάξις (táxis), τάγμα (tágma)	ataxia, chemotaxis, epitaxis, eutaxy, hypotaxis, magnetotaxis, metasyntactic, parataxis, phonotactic, phonotactics, phototaxis, rheotaxis, syntactic, syntagma, syntagmatic, syntax, tactic, tagma, taxis, taxonomy, thermotaxis
tal-	ankle	Latin	talus	talus
tang-, -ting-, tact-, tag-	touch	Latin	tangere (past participle tactus)	attain, contact, contagious, contingent, contingency, contiguous, intact, tactile, tangent, tangible
tapet-	carpet	Latin	tapete, tapetis	tapestry, tapetum, tapis
tarac- (ΤΑΡΑΧ)	stir	Greek	ταράσσειν (tarássein), ταρακτός, ταρακτικός, τάραγμα, θράσσω	ataractic, ataraxia
tard-	slow	Latin	tardus	retard, tardigrade, tardy
tars-	ankle	Greek	ταρσός (tarsós, "a flat basket")	metatarsus, tarsal, tarsoclasis, tarsometatarsus, tarsus
taur-	bull	Greek	ταῦρος (taûros)	Minotaur, taurobolium, taurocholic, tauromachy
taur-	bull	Latin	taurus	Taurus
tec- (ΤΑΚ)	melt	Greek	τήκειν	eutectic, eutectoid
tec-, toc- (ΤΕΚ)	childbirth	Greek	τίκτειν, τόκος (tókos)	ditokous, dystocia, embiotocid, monotocous, teknonymous, teknonymy, tokophobia
techn- (ΤΕΚ)	art, skill	Greek	τίκτειν (tíktein), τέχνη (tékhnē), τέκτων, τέκτονος (téktōn, téktonos), τεκτονικός (tektonikós)	architect, polytechnic, techne, technique, technocracy, technocrat, technogaianism, technology, technophilia, technophobia, tectonic
tecn- (ΤΕΚ)	child	Greek	τίκτω, τέκνον, τέκνου (téknon, téknou)	teknonymous, teknonymy
teg-, tect-	cover	Latin	tegere, tectus	contection, detect, detectable, detection, detective, detector, integument, integumentary, obtect, pretectal, pretectum, protect, protection, protective, protector, protectorate, protectory, protectress, protectrix, protégé, protégée, tectrix, tectum, tegmen, tegmental, tegula, tegular, tegument, tile, tog, toga, togate, togavirus, toggery
tele-	far, end	Greek	τῆλε (têle)	telegram, telegraph, telemetry, telepathy, telephone, telescope, television
tele-	complete	Greek	τέλος, τέλεος (télos, téleos), τέλεσις (télesis)	atelectasis, ateleiosis, atelophobia, teleology, telesis, toll
tem-, tom- (ΤΕΜ)	cut	Greek	τέμνειν (témnein), τομός (tomós), τόμος (tómos), τομή (tomḗ), τμῆσις (tmêsis)	acrotomophilia, anatomy, apotemnophilia, atom, atomic, autotomy, diatom, dichotomous, dichotomy, ectomy, entomology, entomomancy, entomophagous, entomophilous, epitome, monatomic, pentatomic, polyatomic, polytomy, Temnospondyli, tmesis, tome, tomogram, tomography, trichotomous, trichotomy
temn-, tempt-	–	Latin	temnere	contemn, contemnible, contempt, contemptible, contumacious, contumacy, contumelious, contumely
tempor-	time	Latin	tempus, temporis	contemporaneous, contemporary, extemporaneous, tempo, temporal, temporary
ten-, ton- (ΤΑΝ)	stretch	Greek	τείνειν (teínein), τεινόμενον, τανύειν (tanúein), τετανός (tetanós), τόνος (tónos), τονικός (tonikós), τονή (tonḗ), τάσις (tásis), ταινία	anhemitonic, atelectasis, atonic, atritonic, barytone, catatonia, catatoniac, catatonic, decatonic, diatonic, ditone, dodecatonic, dystonia, ectasia, enneatonic, entasia, entasis, epitasis, hemitonia, hemitonic, heptatonic, hexatonic, hyperisotonic, hypertonia, hypertonic, hypotenuse, hypotonia, hypotonic, isotonic, microtone, monotone, monotonic, monotonous, monotony, neoteny, octatonic, oxytone, paroxytone, pentatonic, peritoneum, polytonic, proparoxytone, protasis, pyelectasis, syntonic, tetanolysin, tetanospasmin, tetanus, tetany, tetratonic, tone, tonic, tonoplast, tritonic, tune
ten-, -tin-, tent-, tain-, tinu-	hold, keep	Latin	tenere, tentus	abstain, abstention, abstinence, abstinent, appertain, appertinent, appurtenance, appurtenant, contain, containment, content, contentive, contentment, continence, continent, continental, continual, continuance, continuant, continuation, continuative, continue, continuity, continuous, continuum, contratenor, countenance, detain, detainder, detainee, detainer, detainment, detention, detinue, discontent, discontentment, discontinuance, discontinuation, discontinue, discontinuity, discontinuous, entertain, entertainment, equicontinuity, equicontinuous, impertinence, impertinent, incontinence, incontinent, intenible, intercontinental, irretentive, lieutenant, maintain, maintenance, malcontent, obtain, obtainment, obtention, pertain, pertinacious, pertinacity, pertinence, pertinent, purtenance, reobtain, retain, retainer, retainment, retention, retentive, retinue, se-tenant, sustenance, sustentacular, sustentaculum, sustentation, sustention, tenable, tenace, tenacious, tenacity, tenancy, tenant, tenet, tenor, tenure, tenurial, tenuto, transcontinental
tend-, tens-	stretch, strain	Latin	tendere (past participle tensus)	ambitendency, attempt, attend, attendee, attent, attention, attentive, coextend, coextension, coextensive, contend, contention, contentious, detent, détente, distend, distension, distent, distention, entendre, entente, extend, extensible, extension, extensional, extensionality, extensive, extensivity, extensor, extent, inattention, inattentive, inextensible, intend, intense, intensification, intension, intensional, intensity, intensive, intent, obtend, obtension, ostensible, ostension, ostensive, ostensory, ostent, ostentation, ostentatious, portend, portension, portent, portentous, pretend, pretense, pretension, subtend, subtense, superintend, superintendency, superintendent, tempt, temptation, tend, tendency, tendential, tendentious, tender, tense, tensible, tensile, tensility, tension, tensure, tent, tentacle, tentacular, tentage, tentation, tentative, tentiginous, tentorium
tenu-	slender, thin	Latin	tenuare "make thin", from tenuis "thin"	attenuate, extenuate, tenuous
tep-	be warm	Latin	tepere	subtepid, tepefaction, tepid, tepidarium, tepidity, tepor
ter-, trit-	rub, wear	Latin	terere, tritus	attrition, contrite, contrition, detriment, detrimental, detrital, detrition, detritivore, detritivorous, detritus, retriment, tribulation, trite, triturate, trituration, triture
tere-	guard	Greek	τηρεῖν (tēreîn), τήρησις (tḗrēsis)	synteresis
teret-	rounded	Latin	teres, teretis	subterete, teretial
terg-, ters-	wipe	Latin	tergere, tersus	absterge, abstergent, abstersion, abstersive, deterge, detergency, detergent, terse
termin-	boundary, limit, end	Latin	terminus	determine, interminable, terminal, termination
tern-	three each	Latin	terni	ternary, ternion
terr-	earth	Latin	terra	inter, subterranean, terrace, terracotta, terrain, terrarium, terrestrial, territory
terti-	third	Latin	tertius	tertian, tertiary
test-	witness	Latin	testis	attest, contest, detest, protest, testament, testify, testimony
tetart-	fourth	Greek	τέταρτος (tétartos)	tetartanopsia, tetartohedric
tetr-	four	Greek	τέτϝαρες, τέσσαρες, τεσσάρων (téssares, tessárōn)	diatessaron, tetragon, tetrahedron, tetralogy, tetrameter, tetraphobia, tetrapod, tetrode
teuch-	make	Greek	τεύχειν (teúkhein), τυγχάνω, τευκτός, τευκτικός, τεῦξις (teûxis), τεῦγμα (teûgma), τεῦχος, τεύχεος (teûkhos, teúkheos), τύχη (túkhē), τυκτός (tuktós)	Heptateuch, octateuch, Pentateuch
tex-, text-	weave	Latin	texere, textus	context, subtle, pretext, text, textile, texture
thalam-	chamber, bed	Greek	θάλαμος (thálamos)	epithalamion, hypothalamus, prothalamion, thalamotomy, thalamus
thalass-	sea	Greek	θάλασσα (thálassa)	Panthalassa, thalassemia, thalassic, thalassophobia
than- (ΘΑΝ)	death	Greek	θνήσκειν, θάνατος (thánatos)	euthanasia, thanatocoenosis, thanatoid, thanatology, thanatophobia, thanatophoric, thanatopsis
thaumat-	miracle	Greek	θαυματ (thaumat)	thaumatology, thaumaturge, thaumaturgy
the-, thus-	god	Greek	θεός (theós)	atheism, atheistic, ditheism, enthusiasm, monotheism, Pantheon, polytheism, Thea, theobromine, theocracy, theodicy, Theodore, theogony, theology, theophobia, Timothy, tritheism
the- (ΘΕ)	put	Greek	τιθέναι (tithénai), θετός (thetós), θετικός (thetikós), θέσις (thésis), θέμα (théma), θήκη (thḗkē)	anathema, anathematic, antithesis, antithetic, apothecium, athematic, Bibliotheca, bodega, boutique, deem, doom, enthesis, enthetic, epenthesis, epenthetic, epitheca, epithet, hypothec, hypothesis, monothematic, nomothetic, oligosynthetic, parenthesis, parenthetic, polysynthetic, prosthesis, prosthetic, prothesis, prothetic, pseudothecium, synthesis, synthetic, theca, thecium, thematic, theme, Themis, thesaurus, thesis, treasure
thea-	view	Greek	θεᾶσθαι (theâsthai), θέατρον (théatron)	amphitheatre, metatheatre, theatre, theatric
thel-	nipple	Greek	θηλή (thēlḗ)	athelia, endothelium, epithelium, mesothelioma, mesothelium, thelium, thelial
theori-	speculation	Greek	θεωρητικός (theōrētikós), θεώρημα (theṓrēma), θεωρία (theōría)	theorem, theoretic, theorist, theorize, theory
ther-	beast, animal	Greek	θήρ, θηρός (thḗr, thērós)	therapsid, therianthropy, theroid, theropod, theropsid
therap-	serve	Greek	θεράπων (therápōn), θεραπεύειν (therapeúein), θεραπευτός, θεραπευτικός (therapeutikós), θεραπεία (therapeía)	therapeutic, therapist, therapy
therm-	heat, warm	Greek	θέρεσθαι (théresthai), θέρμη (thérmē), θερμός (thermós)	thermal, athermancy, diathermancy, ectotherm, endotherm, endothermic, exothermic, geothermic, homeothermy, hyperthermia, hypothermia, isotherm, poikilotherm, thermobaric, thermochromism, thermodynamic, thermolysis, thermometer, thermophilic, thermophobia, thermoplastic, thermoplegia, thermos, thermosphere, thermostat, thermostatic
thig- (ΘΙΓ)	touch	Greek	θιγγάνειν (thingánein), θίξις (thíxis), θίγημα (thígēma)	antithixotropic, thigmonasty, thigmotaxis, thixotropic, thixotropy
thorac-	chest	Greek	θώραξ, θώρακος (thṓrax, thṓrakos)	hemothorax, pneumothorax, thoracic, thorax
thym-	mood	Greek	θυμός (thumós)	cyclothymia, dysthymia, euthymia, hyperthymia
thyr-	door	Greek	θύρα (thúra)	thyratron
thyre-	large shield	Greek	θυρεός (thureós)	Thyreophora, thyroid, thyrotropin, thyroxine
tim-	be afraid	Latin	timere	timid, timorous
ting-, tinct- (TING)	dye, moisten	Latin	tingere, tinctus	aquatint, distain, mezzotint, tinct, tinctorial, tincture, tinge, tingent, tint
tom-	cut	Greek	τομή (tomḗ), τόμος (tómos)	anatomy, appendectomy, atom, dichotomy, ectomy, embolectomy, tome, tonsillectomy, vasectomy
ton- (ΤΑΝ)	stretch	Greek	τείνειν (teínein), τόνος (tónos), τονικός (tonikós)	isotonic, monotone, tone
top-	place, location	Greek	τόπος (tópos)	atopic, atopy, dystopia, ectopia, ectopic, entopic, epitope, eutopia, isotope, nomotopic, polytope, topiary, topic, topography, topology, toponomastics, toponym, toponymy, topos, utopia, zonotope
torn-	turn, rotate	Latin from Greek	tornare < τόρνος (tórnos)	tornado, tournament, turn
torpe-	be numb	Latin	torpere	torpent, torpid, torpor
torqu-, tort-	twist	Latin	torquere, tortus	contort, distort, extort, extortion, retort, torque, torsion, tortuous, torture
tot-	all, whole	Latin	totus	subtotal, total, totality
tox-	arrow, bow, poison	Greek	τόξον (tóxon)	anatoxin, antitoxin, autotoxin, exotoxin, intoxicate, neurotoxin, psychotoxic, toxic, toxin, toxoid, toxology, toxoplasmosis
trab-	beam	Latin	trabs, trabis	trabeculae
trach-	rough	Greek	τραχύς (trakhús)	trachea, tracheids, tracheitis, tracheophyte, tracheostomy, tracheotomy, trachoma
trag-	he-goat	Greek	τράγος (trágos)	tragedy, tragic, tragus
trah-, tract-	draw, pull	Latin	tractare, frequentative of trahere, tractus	abstract, attract, contract, detract, retract, subtract, subtrahend, tractable, traction, tractor
trans-, tra-, tran-	across	Latin	trans	intransigent, tradition, transact, transcend, transient, transitory, transparent, transport
trapez-	four-legged, table	Greek	τράπεζα (trápeza), τραπέζιον, (trapézion)	trapeze, trapezium, trapezius, trapezohedron, trapezoid
traum-	wound	Greek	τραῦμα, τραῦματος (traûma, traûmatos)	trauma, traumatic, traumatize, traumatophobia
trecent-	three hundred	Latin	trecenti	trecentennial, trecentillion
trech-, troch-	run, wheel	Greek	τρέχειν (trékhein), τρεχόμενον, τρόχος (tróchos), τροχός, τροχοῦ (trochós), τρόχωσις, τροχαῖος (trochaîos), τροχαϊκός (trochaïkós), τροχοειδής	ditrochee, epitrochoid, hypotrochoid, trochaic, trochanter, trochee, trochelminth, trochlea, trochophore, trochoid
tredec-	thirteen	Latin	tredecim	tredecimal
treiskaidek-	thirteen	Greek	τρεισκαίδεκα (treiskaídeka)	triskaidekaphobia, triskaidecagon
trem-	tremble	Latin	tremere	tremor
trema-	hole	Greek	τετραίνω, τρῆμα (trêma)	monotrematous, monotreme, trema, tréma, trematode
trep-, trop-	turn	Greek	τρέπειν (trépein), τρέψις (trépsis), τρόπος, τρόπου (trópos), τροπή, τροπῆς (tropḗ), τροπικός (tropikós)	allotrope, anisotropy, Atropos, ectropion, entropic, entropion, entropy, heliotropism, isentropic, isotrope, isotropic, isotropy, pleiotropic, pleiotropy, polytrope, protrepsis, protreptic, psychotropic, treponeme, treponematosis, treponemiasis, trope, tropic, tropism, tropopause, troposphere, trove
treph-, troph-	feed, grow	Greek	τρέφειν (tréphein), τροφός (trophós), τροφή (trophḗ), θρέμμα	amyotrophic, atrophy, autotroph, auxotrophy, chemolithoautotroph, dystrophy, hemidystrophy, heterotroph, hypertrophy, lithoautotroph, lithotroph, mixotroph, organotroph, phagotrophy, photoheterotroph, phototroph, phototrophic, phototrophy, pogonotrophy, poliodystrophy, prototrophy, trophectoderm, trophic, trophobiosis, trophobiotic, trophoblast, trophoblastic, trophozoite
trepid-	tremble	Latin	trepidare "to tremble, hurry", from trepidus "alarmed, scared"	intrepid, trepid, trepidation
tri-	three	Greek	τρεῖς, τρία (tría), τριάς	atritonic, triad, triadic, Triassic, tricycle, trigon, triode, tripod, trisyllabic, tritonic
tri-	three	Latin	trēs	triangle, triumvirate, trivia
trib-, tript-	rub	Greek	τρίβειν (tríbein), τριπτός, τρῖψις	diatribe, tribochromism, tribology, trypsin, tryptic
tribu-	pay	Latin	tribuere "to pay", from tribus	attribute, contribute, distribute, retribution, tribe, tribulation, tribunal, tribune, tributary, tribute
tricen-	thirty each	Latin	triceni	tricenary
tricesim-, trigesim-	thirtieth	Latin	tricesimus	trigesimal
trich-	hair	Greek	θρίξ, τριχός (trikhós)	peritrichous, trichopathophobia, Trichoptera
trin-	three each	Latin	trini	trinary, trine, trinity
trit-	third	Greek	τρίτος (trítos)	tritagonist, tritanomaly, tritanopia, trite, tritium
tritic-	wheat	Latin	triticum	triticale
troch-	wheel	Greek	τροχός (trokhós)	trochlea
trop-	turn	Greek	τρόπος (tropos)	contrive, heliotropism, isotrope, psychotropic, retrieve, trope, tropic, tropism, troposphere, troubadour, trove
troph-	feed, grow	Greek	τροφή, τροφός (trophós)	dystrophy, pogonotrophy, trophic
truc-	fierce	Latin	trux, trucis	truculence, truculency, truculent
trud-, trus-	thrust	Latin	trudere, trusus	abstrude, abstruse, abstrusion, abstrusity, detrude, detrusion, detrusor, extrude, extrusible, extrusion, extrusive, inobtrusive, intrude, intrusion, intrusive, nonintrusive, obtrude, obtrusion, obtrusive, protrude, protrudent, protrusile, protrusion, protrusive, retrude, retruse, retrusion, retrusive
trunc-	cut off	Latin	truncare "to maim, mutilate", from truncus "mutilated, cut off"	detruncate, detruncation, entrench, entrenchment, intrench, intrenchment, obtruncate, obtruncation, omnitruncation, retrench, retrenchment, tranche, tranchet, trench, trenchancy, trenchant, truncate, truncation, truncheon, trunk, trunnion
tryp-	bore	Greek	τρυπᾶν (trupân), τρύπανον (trúpanon)	trepan, trypanophobia, trypanosome
tum-	be swollen	Latin	tumere	detumescence, detumescent, intumescence, tumefacient, tumefaction, tumesce, tumescence, tumescent, tumid, tumidity, tumor, tumorous, tumular, tumulose, tumulous, tumult, tumultuary, tumultuous, tumulus
turb-	disturb	Latin	turba	disturb, disturbance, nonperturbative, perturb, perturbance, perturbation, perturbative, trouble, troublous, turbid, turbidity, turbinate, turbine, turbulence, turbulent
tuss-	cough	Latin	tussis, tussire	pertussis, tussive
tymb-	mound	Greek	τύμβος (túmbos), τυμβεύω, τύμβευμα	entomb, tomb
tympan-	drum	Greek	τύμπανον (túmpanon)	timbre, timpanist, tympani, tympanum
typ- (ΤΥΠ)	stamp, model	Greek	τύπτειν (túptein), τύπος (túpos), τυπικός (tupikós), τύμπανον (túmpanon)	allotype, archetype, ecotype, ectype, epitype, ergatotype, heterotype, heterotypic, holotype, homeotypic, homotype, homotypic, isosyntype, isotype, lectotype, logotype, monotypic, neotype, paralectotype, paratype, phenotype, prototype, schizotypic, syntype, type, typography, typology
typh-	smoke	Greek	τύφειν (túphein), τῦφος (tûphos), τυφώδης	typhoid, typhous, typhus
tyrann-	terrible, tyrant	Greek	τύραννος (túrannos)	tyrannize, tyrannosaurus, tyranny, tyrant
