= Hejaz (disambiguation) =

Hejaz or Hijaz (Arabic: الحجاز al-Ḥiǧāz, literally "the barrier") may refer to the:

- Hejaz, a geological region in the Arabian peninsula
  - Hijaz Mountains, a mountain range

== States ==
- Sharifate of Mecca (968–1925), also known as 'Emirate of Mecca'
- Habesh Eyalet (1554–1872), also known as 'Habesh and Hejaz' or the 'Ottoman Province of Abyssinia'
- Hejaz Vilayet (1872–1916), also known as 'Ottoman Hejaz'
- Kingdom of Hejaz (1916–1925)
- Kingdom of Nejd and Hejaz (1926–1932)

== Others ==
- Hijaz or Hijaz Bhairav, a raga in Hindustani classical music
- Hijaz-Nahawand maqam, also known as Phrygian dominant scale
- 1910 Hedjaz meteorite fall
