= Blues scale =

Musical scales

The term blues scale refers to several different scales with differing numbers of pitches and related characteristics. A blues scale is often formed by the addition of an out-of-key "blue note" to an existing scale, notably the flat fifth addition to the minor pentatonic scale or the addition of the minor third to a major pentatonic scale. However, the heptatonic blues scale can be considered a major scale with altered intervals.

== Types ==
=== Hexatonic ===
The hexatonic, or six-note, blues scale consists of the minor pentatonic scale plus the ♭5th degree of the original heptatonic scale. This added note can be spelled as either a ♭5 or a ♯4.

The first known published version of the blues scale, from Aebersold's revised 1970 Volume 1: How to Play Jazz and Improvise

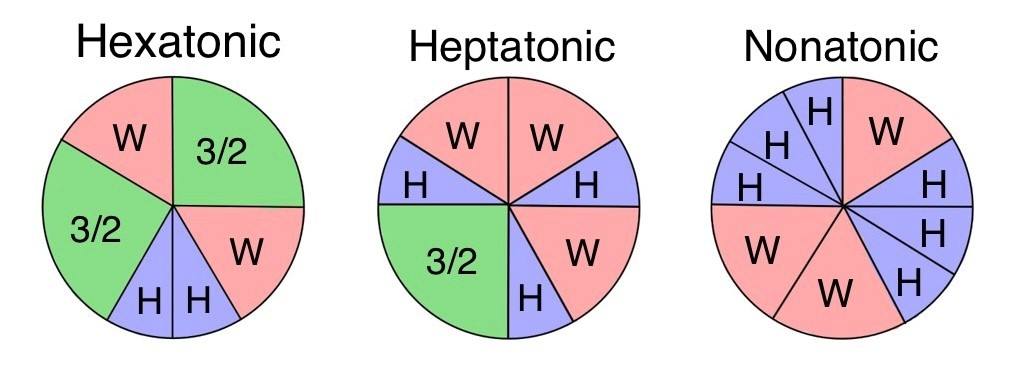
Chromatic circle diagrams of the Hexatonic, Heptatonic, and Nonatonic blues scales.

The first known published instance of this scale is Jamey Aebersold's How to Play Jazz and Improvise Volume 1 (1970 revision, p. 26), and Jerry Coker claims that David Baker may have been the first educator to organise this particular collection of notes pedagogically as a scale to be taught in helping beginners evoke the sound of the blues.

A major feature of the blues scale is the use of blue notes—notes that are played or sung microtonally, at a slightly higher or lower pitch than standard. However, since blue notes are considered alternative inflections, a blues scale may be considered to not fit the traditional definition of a scale. At its most basic, a single version of this blues scale is commonly used over all changes (or chords) in a twelve-bar blues progression. Likewise, in contemporary jazz theory, its use is commonly based upon the key rather than the individual chord.

Greenblatt defines two blues scales, the major and the minor. The major blues scale is 1, 2,♭3, 3, 5, 6 and the minor is 1, ♭3, 4, ♭5, 5, ♭7. The latter is the same as the hexatonic scale described above.

In the Movable do solfège, the hexatonic major blues scale is solmized as "do-re-me-mi-sol-la"; In the La-based minor movable do solfège, the hexatonic minor blues scale is solmized as "la-do-re-me-mi-sol".

=== Heptatonic ===
One heptatonic, or seven-note, conception of the blues scale is as a diatonic scale (a major scale) with lowered third, fifth, and seventh degrees, which is equivalent to the dorian ♭5 scale, the second mode of the harmonic major scale. Blues practice is derived from the "conjunction of 'African scales' and the diatonic western scales".

Steven Smith argues that, "to assign blue notes to a 'blues scale' is a momentous mistake, then, after all, unless we alter the meaning of 'scale'".

=== Nonatonic ===
An essentially nine-note blues scale is defined by Benward and Saker as a chromatic variation of the major scale featuring a flat third and seventh degrees (in effect substitutions from Dorian mode) which, "alternating with the normal third and seventh scale degrees are used to create the blues inflection. These 'blue notes' represent the influence of African scales on this music."

A different and non-formal way of playing the scale is by the use of quarter tones, added to the 3rd and 7th degrees of the minor blues scale. For example, the A minor blues scale with quarter tones is A–B–C–D–E–F–G, where is a half sharp. Also, the note D♯ can be used as an additional note. Guitar players can raise a given note by a quarter tone through bending.

== Usage ==
Hit songs in a blues key include, "Rock Me"..., "Jumpin' Jack Flash"..., "Higher Ground"..., "Purple Haze"..., "I Can See for Miles"..., "After Midnight"..., "Just" (Radiohead song) "She's a Woman"..., "Long Cool Woman in a Black Dress"..., "Pink Cadillac"..., "Give Me One Reason"..., and many others.

In jazz, the blues scale is used by improvising musicians in a variety of harmonic contexts. It can be played for the entire duration of a twelve bar blues progression constructed off the root of the first dominant seventh chord. For example, a C hexatonic blues scale could be used to improvise a solo over a C blues chord progression. The blues scale can also be used to improvise over a minor chord. Jazz educator Jamey Aebersold describes the sound and feel of the blues scale as "funky," "down-home," "earthy," or "bluesy."

== See also ==
- Altered chord
