= Romanian major scale =

Musical scale

Component pitches
- C, D♭, E, F♯, G, A, B♭

Qualities
- Number of pitch classes: 7
- Forte number: 7-31
- Complement: 5-31
- Interval vector: <3,3,6,3,3,3>

The Romanian major scale also known as the Lydian Dominant ♭2 scale is a heptatonic scale subset of the octatonic scale with an omitted ♭3 degree. It is noted for its flattened 2nd and sharpened fourth degrees, the latter a distinctive feature of Romanian traditional music. It has the following interval structure in semitones: 1, 3, 2, 1, 2, 1, 2, giving it the notes C, D♭, E, F♯, G, A, B♭ in the key of C. Though it is called a major scale, it is typically played over a C13 (♭9) (♯11) (also F♯ major over C) dominant chord. This is an enharmonic mode of B Harmonic Minor (A♯ & C♯ in B Harmonic Minor, B♭ & D♭ in C Romanian Major), along with D Harmonic Major (C♯ in G Harmonic Major, D♭ in C Romanian Major). The root note of F Harmonic Major is raised a semitone to F♯, and the root note of D Aeolian Dominant lowered a semitone to D♭. There is also a ♮6 with the D♭ Super Lydian Augmented scale, lowering the B♮ to B♭.

As the Romanian major scale is a subset of the octatonic scale with no ♭3, it should have diminished seventh chords, particularly from its second note. This scale's ♯4th and 6th notes have minor or major (dominant) chord, while the root only has a major (dominant) chord (distinction from the half-whole diminished scale that the root, ♭3rd, ♯4th, and 6th notes have full diminished, half diminished, minor, and dominant chords built from that scale).

The 5th mode, Jazz minor flat 5, also known as Jeth's Mode, is a jazz minor or melodic minor scale with a flattened 5th, and is named after Dutch composer Willem Jeths. It can also be thought of as a whole half diminished scale omitting the augmented fifth. It can be used for soloing instead of regular jazz minor. The Jazz minor flat 5 mode in C contains the notes C, D, E♭, F, G ♭, A, B, which has the formula 1, 2, ♭3, 4, ♭5, 6, 7. This is an enharmonic mode of E Harmonic Minor (D♯ & F♯ in E Harmonic Minor, E♭ & G♭ in C Jeth's Mode), along with G Harmonic Major (F♯ in G Harmonic Major, Gb in C Jeth's Mode). The root note of Bb Harmonic Major is raised a semitone to B♮, and the root note of G Aeolian Dominant lowered a semitone to G♭. There is also a ♮6 with the Gb Super Lydian Augmented scale, lowering the E♮ to E♭.

== Modes ==
The scale contains the following modes:

Mode	Name of scale	Degrees								Notes (in C Romanian Major)								Chords
1	Romanian Major Scale	1	♭2	3	♯4	5	6	♭7	8	C	D♭	E	F♯	G	A	B♭	C	C^{(7,♭9,#11,13)}
2	Super Lydian Augmented ♮6/ Nohkan #2	1	♯2	♯3	♯4	♯5	6	7	8	D♭	E	F♯	G	A	B♭	C	D♭	D♭dim^{7} or D♭m^{M7♭5}
3	Locrian ♮27	1	2	♭3	4	♭5	♭6	7	8	E	F♯	G	A	B♭	C	D♭	E	Edim^{7}
4	Istrian [heptatonic]/ Altered Dominant 6/Blues Phrygian ♭4	1	♭2	♭3	♭4	♭5	6	♭7	8	F♯	G	A	B♭	C	D♭	E	F♯	F♯m or F♯^{(7,♭9, ♯9, ♯11)}
5	Jazz Minor ♭5 (Jeth's Mode)	1	2	♭3	4	♭5	6	7	8	G	A	B♭	C	D♭	E	F♯	G	Gdim^{7} or Gm^{M7♭5}
6	Javanese ♭4/ Superphrygian ♮6/Altered Dominant ♮5 ♮6/Dorian ♭2 ♭4	1	♭2	♭3	♭4	5	6	♭7	8	A	B♭	C	D♭	E	F♯	G	A	Am or A^{(7,♭9,♯9,13)}
7	Lydian Augmented ♭3	1	2	♭3	♯4	♯5	6	7	8	B♭	C	D♭	E	F♯	G	A	B♭	B♭dim^{7} or B♭m^{M7♭5}

== See also ==
- Hungarian major scale (the reversed version of the Romanian major scale)
- Lydian dominant scale
- Ukrainian Dorian (Romanian minor) scale
