= Persian scale =

Music scale used in Middle Eastern compositions

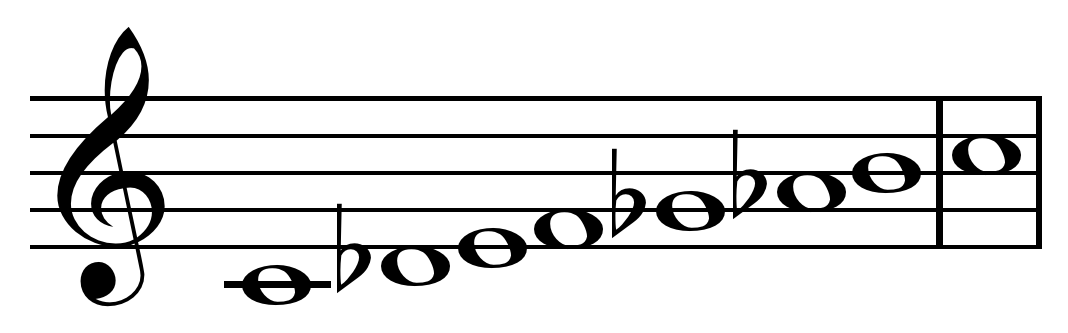
Persian scale on C.

The Persian scale also known as Double Harmonic Major ♭5 is a musical scale occasionally found in guitar scale books, along with other scales inspired by Middle Eastern music. It is characterized by the liberal use of half steps (4), augmented seconds (2), and frequent use of chromaticism. Compare this to the one augmented second of the harmonic minor or the use of only two half-steps in all diatonic scales. This is also the Locrian mode with a major third and major seventh degree.

In Hindustani Classical Music, this corresponds to the raga Lalit.

The sequence of steps is as follows:

- H, +, H, H, W, +, H
- (W = Whole step - H = Half step - + = augmented second)

Beginning on C:

- C, D♭, E, F, G♭, A♭, B, C

== Modes ==
This scale contains the following modes:

Mode	Name of scale	Degrees							
1	Persian Scale (or Double Harmonic Major ♭5)	1	♭2	3	4	♭5	♭6	7	8
2	Ionian ♯2 ♯6	1	♯2	3	4	5	♯6	7	8
3	Ultraphrygian 3	1	♭2	3	♭4	5	♭6	7	8
4	Hungarian/Gypsy Minor ♭2, Neapolitan Minor ♯4, Todi Thaat	1	♭2	♭3	♯4	5	♭6	7	8
5	Lydian ♯3 ♯6	1	2	♯3	♯4	5	♯6	7	8
6	Mixolydian Augmented ♯2	1	♯2	3	4	♯5	6	♭7	8
7	Chromatic Hypophrygian Inverse	1	♭2	3	4	♭5	6	7	8

== See also ==
- It is most closely related to the Phrygian dominant scale as their bottom tetrachords are identical. It can also be obtained by flattening the fifth degree of the double harmonic scale.
- Dastgah, musical scales used in Persian traditional music
