= Hungarian major scale =

Heptatonic music scale

- On C, ascending (semitones indicated by slurs)

Component pitches
- C, D♯, E, F♯, G, A, B♭

Qualities
- Number of pitch classes: 7
- Forte number: 7-31
- Complement: 5-31
- Interval vector: <3,3,6,3,3,3>

The Hungarian major scale or the Lydian Dominant ♯2 scale is a heptatonic scale subset of the octatonic scale with an omitted ♭2 degree. It has the following interval structure in semitones: 3, 1, 2, 1, 2, 1, 2, giving it the notes C D♯ E F♯ G A B♭ in the key of C. It is, "used extensively in Hungarian gypsy music [sic]", as well as in classical music by composers including Franz Liszt (d. 1886) and Zoltán Kodály (d. 1967)," as well as in Thea Musgrave's Horn Concerto (1971). As a chord scale, Hungarian Major is both a dominant and a diminished scale, with a fully diminished seventh chord composed of C, D♯, F♯, and A, and a dominant seventh chord composed of C, E, G, and B♭. This is an enharmonic mode of B♭ Harmonic Major (E♭ and G♭ in B♭ Harmonic Major, D♯ & F♯ in C Hungarian Major), along with G Harmonic Minor (E♭ in G Harmonic Minor, D♯ in C Hungarian Major) and E Hungarian Minor (A♯ in E Hungarian Minor, B♭ in C Hungarian Major). The root note of D Aeolian Dominant is raised a semitone to D♯, and the root note of B Phrygian Dominant lowered a semitone to B♭. There is also a ♮6 & ♮2 with the B♭ Super Lydian Augmented scale, lowering the C♯ & G♯ to C♮ & G♮.

The triads of the scale are I, ♯ii^{o}, iii^{o}, ♯iv^{o}, v, vi, and ♭VII^{+}, with ♭III (♯II), ♭iii (♯ii), and ♭V (♯IV) also possible. The second mode, C D E♭ F G♭ A♭ B (Semilocrian scale, 3rd mode of Ab Hungarian Major), is appropriate for use with the Locrian mode (C D♭ E♭ F G♭ A♭ B♭) and with the minor7b5 chord on the tonic (in C: C D♯/E♭ F♯/G♭ B♭) contexts.

It is not related to the similarly-named Hungarian minor scale (C D E♭ F♯ G A♭ B) except that both scales are heptatonic, they share four notes in common, both feature one augmented second between consecutive degrees, and, like the major scale and the minor scale, the Hungarian major has a major third and sixth degree and the Hungarian minor has a minor third and minor sixth degree (however, unlike the major and minor scales the Hungarian major has a minor seventh degree and Hungarian minor has a major seventh degree).

In India's Carnatic music, this corresponds to the raga Nasikabhushani.

== Modes ==
The scale contains the following modes:

Mode	Name of scale	Degrees												
1	Hungarian major	1			♯2	3		♯4	5		6	♭7		8
2	Altered Diminished 6	1	♭2		♭3	♭4		♭5	6		7			8
3	Harmonic minor ♭5 or Locrian ♮2 and ♮7	1		2	♭3		4	♭5		♭6			7	8
4	Altered Dominant ♮6	1	♭2		♭3	♭4		♭5			6	♭7		8
5	Melodic Minor ♯5	1		2	♭3		4			♯5	6		7	8
6	Ukrainian Dorian ♭2	1	♭2		♭3			♯4	5		6	♭7		8
7	Nohkan flute scale or Lydian Augmented ♯3	1		2			♯3	♯4		♯5	6		7	8

== See also ==
- Romanian major scale (the retrograde version of the Hungarian major scale)
