= Simhendramadhyamam =

57th raga in the Melakarta

Simhendramadhyama
- Arohanam: S R₂ G₂ M₂ P D₁ N₃ Ṡ
- Avarohanam: Ṡ N₃ D₁ P M₂ G₂ R₂ S
- Equivalent: Hungarian minor scale

Simhendramadhyamam is a ragam in Carnatic music (musical scale of South Indian classical music). It is the 57th melakarta rāgam in the 72 melakarta rāgam system of Carnatic music. It is called Sumadyuti in Muthuswami Dikshitar school of Carnatic music. It is said to be borrowed into Hindustani music from Carnatic music.

== Structure and lakshana ==
Simhendramadhyamam scale with shadjam at C

It is the 3rd rāgam in the 10th chakra Disi. The mnemonic name is Disi-Go. The mnemonic phrase is sa ri gi mi pa dha nu. Its ārohaṇa-avarohaṇa structure (ascending and descending scale) is as follows (see swaras in Carnatic music for details on below notation and terms):

- ārohaṇa: S R₂ G₂ M₂ P D₁ N₃ Ṡ (Note: Alternate notations: Hindustani: S R G̱ M̄ P Ḏ N Ṡ; Western: C D E♭ F♯ G A♭ B C)
- avarohaṇa: Ṡ N₃ D₁ P M₂ G₂ R₂ S (Note: Alternate notations: Hindustani: Ṡ N Ḏ P M̄ G̱ R S; Western: C B A♭ G F♯ E♭ D C)

It is also equivalent to the Hungarian minor scale that is also called the Gypsy minor scale in Western music.

This musical scale uses the notes chatushruti rishabham, sadharana gandharam, prati madhyamam, shuddha daivatam and kakali nishadham. As it is a melakarta rāgam, by definition it is a sampūrṇa rāgam (has all seven notes in ascending and descending scale). It is the prati madhyamam equivalent of Kiraṇāvali ( also known by name kīravāṇi ), which is the 21st melakarta.
