= Gypsy scale =

Musical scales based on Romani music

The term Gypsy scale refers to one of several musical scales named after their support of and association with Romani or Gypsy music.

- Double harmonic scale (major), the fifth mode of Hungarian minor, or Double Harmonic minor, scale, also known as the Byzantine scale.
- Hungarian minor scale, minor scale with raised fourth and seventh degrees, also known as Double Harmonic minor scale.
- Phrygian dominant scale, also known as Freygish or Jewish scale; Spanish Gypsy or Spanish Phrygian scale.
