= Berklee method =

In music performance and education, the Berklee method is the music theory, terminology, and practice taught at Berklee College of Music, the largest independent college of contemporary music in the world. The "Berklee method" was founded by Lawrence Berk after study with Joseph Schillinger regarding the latter's "elaborate system of composition that employed mathematical permutation and combination process to generate rhythms, harmonies, and melodies".

Later, attempting to codify jazz and popular music practice, the Berklee method often differs from common practice harmony and voice-leading rules or guidelines since the form and function of jazz and popular music differs from common practice form and function. For example, Berklee Music Theory - Book 2 recommends the following accompaniment for a given lead sheet, while this progression does not occur in common practice theory since all the chords are seventh chords and unprepared dissonant.

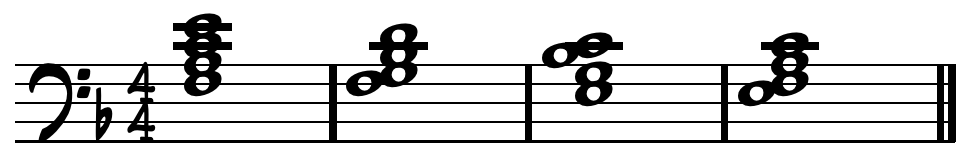
Accompaniment acceptable in the Berklee method but not in common practice theory.

Branford Marsalis notes how Berklee music theory may be an inadequate description of traditional jazz as well having a tendency toward prescriptivism: "Berklee has its own system of doing things, the Berklee way, the Berklee method. They basically say that when you write things that are theoretically against the Berklee method, then they're incorrect. Even if they sound great. Musically they sound great, but theoretically it's wrong, so it's wrong. Which is not the purpose of music. Music theories are just theories."

== See also ==
- Four note group
- Kodály Method
