= Double harmonic scale =

Musical scale with unusual steps

The double harmonic major scale also known as Ionian ♭2 ♭6, is a musical scale with a flattened second and sixth degree. This scale is enharmonic to the Mayamalavagowla raga, Bhairav raga, Byzantine scale, Arabic scale (Hijaz Kar), and Gypsy major scale. It can be likened to a gypsy scale because of the diminished step between the 1st and 2nd degrees. Arabic scale may also refer to any Arabic mode, the simplest of which (to Westerners) resembles the double harmonic major scale.

== Details ==
The sequence of steps comprising the double harmonic scale is :

half, augmented second, half, whole, half, augmented second, half

Or, in relation to the tonic note

minor second, major third, perfect fourth and fifth, minor sixth, major seventh, octave

However, this scale is commonly represented with the first and last half step each being represented with quarter tones:

The non-quarter tone form is identical, in terms of notes, to the North Indian Thaat named Bhairav and the South Indian (Carnatic) Melakarta named Mayamalavagowla.

The double harmonic scale is arrived at by either:

- lowering both the second and sixth of the Ionian mode by a semitone.
- lowering the second note and raising the third note of the harmonic minor scale by one semitone.
- raising the seventh of the Phrygian dominant scale (a mode of the harmonic minor scale) by a semitone. The Phrygian dominant in turn is produced by raising the third of the diatonic Phrygian mode (a mode of the major scale) by a semitone.
- raising the third of the neapolitan minor scale by a semitone.
- lowering the second note of the harmonic major scale by a semitone.
- combining the lower half of the Phrygian dominant scale with the upper half of harmonic minor.

It is referred to as the "double harmonic" scale because it contains two harmonic tetrads featuring augmented seconds. By contrast, both the harmonic major and harmonic minor scales contain only one augmented second, located between their sixth and seventh degrees.

There is a variation of the double harmonic major scale called double harmonic major ♭7 (also known as Phrygian dominant or Phrygian ♮3), which is also the fifth mode of the harmonic minor scale. This variation is sometimes confused with the double harmonic major scale because many sources refer to it simply as "double harmonic major" without indicating the "♭7" sign. The primary difference between these two scales is the seventh degree, with the double harmonic major ♭7 scale having a flat seventh (♭7) and the double harmonic major having a natural seventh (♮7).

The scale contains a built-in tritone substitution, a dominant seventh chord a half step above the root, with strong harmonic movement towards the tonic chord.

The double harmonic scale is not commonly used in classical music from Western culture, as it does not closely follow any of the basic musical modes, nor is it easily derived from them. It also does not easily fit into common Western chord progressions such as the authentic cadence. This is because it is mostly used as a modal scale, not intended for much movement through chord progressions.

The double harmonic major scale (in the key of E) was used in Nikolas Roubanis's "Misirlou", and in the Bacchanale from the opera Samson and Delilah by Saint-Saëns. Claude Debussy used the scale in "Soirée dans Grenade", "La Puerta del Vino", and "Sérénade interrompue" to evoke Spanish flamenco music or Moorish heritage. In popular music, Ritchie Blackmore of Deep Purple and Rainbow used the scale in pieces such as "Gates of Babylon" and "Stargazer". The double harmonic major scale (in the key of C) comprises the ostinato of the song "Tradition" from the musical Fiddler on the Roof. The Miles Davis jazz standard "Nardis" also makes use of the double harmonic.. Opeth used this scale in their song "Bleak" from the album Blackwater Park. It is also used by Hans Zimmer in his score for Dune.

== Symmetry and balance ==
The double harmonic scale features radial symmetry, or symmetry around its root, or center note. Breaking up the three note chromaticism and removing this symmetry by sharpening the 2nd or flattening the 7th note respectively by one semitone yields the harmonic major and Phrygian Dominant mode of the harmonic minor scales respectively, each of which, unlike the double harmonic minor scale, has a full diminished chord backbone. Or, breaking up the chromatic cluster by omitting the root altogether results in the octatonic hexchord (6-z49).

Because it features symmetry, its steps form a palindrome. Using the letters T = tone, S = semitone and M = minor third, we can give the seven steps of the scale as SMSTSMS. This string of letters reads the same backwards. In comparison, among the modes of the major scale, the Dorian mode is a palindrome.

Whenever a scale is a palindrome, or has a mode which is palindromic, reflections of that scale generate modes of that same scale (usually chromatically transposed to another root). Thus any reflection of double harmonic gives rise to a class of pitches which contain a double harmonic scale, just like (thanks to the palindromic Dorian) any reflection of the major scale around any point gives rise to a class of pitches which contain the major scale. However, the major scale itself (Ionian mode), in contrast to the double harmonic major, is not a palindrome; its reflection around its root gives rise to a Phrygian mode. The double harmonic major is its own reflection around the root, itself being the palindromic mode.

The double harmonic scale (and its modes like the Hungarian minor scale) is the only seven-note scale (in 12-tone equal temperament) that is perfectly balanced; this means that when its pitches are represented as points on a circle (whose full circumference represents an octave), their average position (or "centre of mass") is the centre of the circle.

== Tetrads ==
The main chords of the double harmonic major are:

The main chords of the c double harmonic major scale.

I^{M7} ♭II^{M7} iii^{6} iv^{M7} V^{ø}^{7} ♭VI+^{M7} vii^{o}^{sus2add13}

There are other possibilities of tetrad:

I+^{M7} ♭II^{7} ♭ii^{M7} ♭ii^{7} ♭ii^{ø}^{7} III^{6} iv^{o} V^{ø}^{6} ♭vi^{o}

In Forte numbers, the possible tetrachord subsets of 7-22 (the double harmonic set) are as follows:

4-3; 4-4; 4-5; 4-7; 4-8; 4-12; 4-14; 4-z15 (dominant ♯9); 4-16; 4-17; 4-18; 4-19; 4-20 (major 7th); 4-25 (french 6th); 4-26 (minor 7th); 4-27 (dominant 7th and half diminished); 4-z29 (dominant 13)

== Modes ==
Like all heptatonic (seven-pitch) scales, the double harmonic scale has a mode for each of its individual scale degrees. The most commonly known of these modes is the 4th mode, the Hungarian minor scale, most similar to the harmonic minor scale with a raised 4th degree. The modes are as follows:

Mode	Name of scale	Degrees							
1	Double harmonic major	1	♭2	3	4	5	♭6	7	8
2	Lydian ♯2 ♯6	1	♯2	3	♯4	5	♯6	7	8
3	Ultraphrygian (Ultralocrian ♮5, Phrygian ♭4 7)	1	♭2	♭3	♭4	5	♭6	7	8
4	Hungarian/Gypsy minor, Harmonic Minor ♯4 (Harmonic Minor ♯11), or Double Harmonic Minor	1	2	♭3	♯4	5	♭6	7	8
5	Mixolydian ♭2 ♭5, Locrian Dominant ♮6	1	♭2	3	4	♭5	6	♭7	8
6	Ionian Augmented ♯2	1	♯2	3	4	♯5	6	7	8
7	Locrian 3 7	1	♭2	3	4	♭5	♭6	7	8

== Related scales ==
Some of the closest existing scales to the double harmonic major scale are the Phrygian dominant scale, the fifth mode of the harmonic minor scale, as they are alike save for the Phrygian dominant's flattened seventh degree. The harmonic major scale (also known as major flat 6 and Ionian flat 6) is identical to the standard major scale aside from the sixth scale degree being flattened by a semitone, differing from the double harmonic major in having a natural second degree.

== See also ==
- Ukrainian Dorian scale
- Arabic music
- Byzantine music
- Neapolitan chord
- Assyrian/Syriac folk music
