= Hungarian minor scale =

Type of musical scale

The Hungarian minor scale on C, ascending

The Hungarian minor scale, double harmonic minor scale,, Gypsy minor scale or the Harmonic minor ♯4 scale is a type of combined musical scale. It is the same as the harmonic minor scale, except that it has a raised fourth scale degree to introduce an additional gap, or augmented second. It is also sometimes called the Lydian Minor scale, because the chord built on the 7th degree is a minor triad, rather than the diminished triad that we get in the regular harmonic minor scale (aka Bm in C minor.) It is a symmetrical scale with a slightly ambiguous tonal centre, due to the many half steps.

Its step pattern is W, H, +, H, H, +, H, where W indicates a whole step, H indicates a half step, and + indicates an augmented second (three half steps, enharmonically equivalent to a minor third but functionally distinct). In intervallic terms, it would be described as: 1 2 ♭3 ♯4 5 ♭6 7.
The scale contains two augmented seconds, one in each tetrachord. It also contains an augmented fourth between the first and fourth degree.
This scale is one of the few perfectly balanced seven-note subsets of the equally tempered chromatic scale: when its pitches are represented as points in a circle whose full circumference represents an octave, their average position (or "centre of mass") is the centre of the circle.

The scale may be used with minor or m+7 chords. See: chord-scale system. Chords that may be derived from the B Hungarian minor scale are Bm(maj7), C♯7♭5, Dmaj7♯5, E♯6sus2♭5, F♯maj7, Gmaj7, G7, A♯m6 and more.

This scale is obtainable from the double harmonic scale by starting from the fourth degree of that scale, so the C Hungarian minor scale is equivalent to the G double harmonic scale.

In Indian classical Carnatic music, Hungarian minor scale corresponds to Simhendramadhyamam, while the Gypsy variant corresponds to Shanmukhapriya.

The Turkish makam equivalent of this scale is Neveser.

This scale is sometimes also referred to as "Gypsy Run", or alternatively "Egyptian Minor Scale", as mentioned by Miles Davis who describes it in his autobiography as "something that I'd learned at Juilliard".

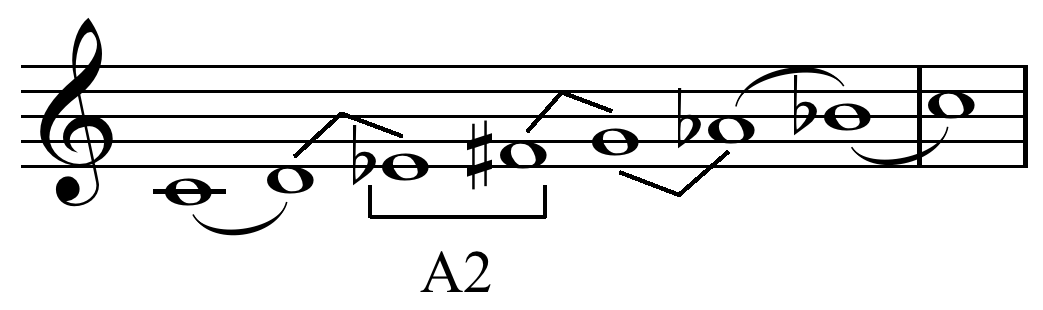
Gypsy (Aeolian ♯4) scale on C

An alternative (and less common) version is the asymmetric Aeolian ♯4 scale, the only difference with the Hungarian minor scale being that the 7th degree of the scale is not raised. This form of the scale can also be used in the fourth mode and would then be referred to as the Neapolitan scale.

== Modes ==
Mode	Name of scale	Notes In A Double Harmonic Minor							
1	Double Harmonic Minor (aka Gypsy Minor, Hungarian Minor, and Japanese Minor)	A	B	C	D♯	E	F	G♯	A
2	Oriental (aka Chinese Dominant, Locrian Dominant ♮6, Mixolydian ♭2 ♭5, and Asian Dominant)	B	C	D♯	E	F	G♯	A	B
3	Ionian ♯2 ♯5 (aka Ionian Augmented ♯2)	C	D♯	E	F	G♯	A	B	C
4	Locrian 3 7	D♯	E	F	G♯	A	B	C	D♯
5	Double Harmonic Major (aka Phrygian Dominant ♮7)	E	F	G♯	A	B	C	D♯	E
6	Lydian ♯2 ♯6	F	G♯	A	B	C	D♯	E	F
7	Ultraphrygian (aka Phrygian ♭4 𝄫7 and Ultralocrian ♮5)	G♯	A	B	C	D♯	E	F	G♯

A Double Harmonic Minor is improvised over an Am(maj7) chord.
B Oriental is improvised over a B7(♭5) chord.
C Ionian ♯2 ♯5 is improvised over a Cmaj7(♯5) chord.
E Double Harmonic Major is improvised over an Emaj7 chord.
F Lydian ♯2 ♯6 is improvised over an F(add ♯11) chord.

== See also ==
- Hungarian major scale
- Ukrainian Dorian scale
- Phrygian dominant scale
- Double harmonic scale
- Gypsy scale
- Verbunkos
