= Phrygian dominant scale =

Fifth mode of the harmonic minor scale

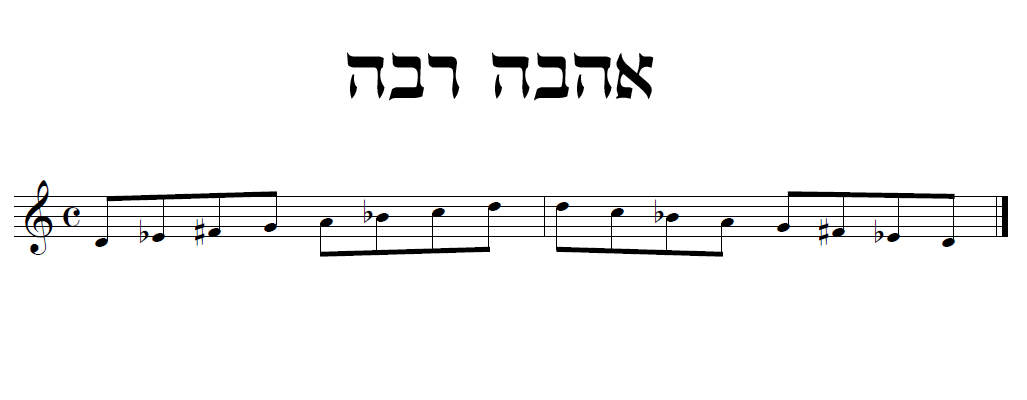
Phrygian dominant scale (Ahavah Rabbah written)

In music, the Phrygian dominant scale also known as Phrygian ♮3 or Double Harmonic Major ♭7 is the fifth mode of the harmonic minor scale, the fifth being the dominant. It is also called the harmonic dominant, altered Phrygian scale, dominant flat 2 flat 6 (in jazz), Hijaz, or Freygish scale (also spelled Fraigish). It resembles the Phrygian mode but with a major third, rather than a minor third.

In the Berklee method, it is known as the Mixolydian ♭9 ♭13 chord scale, a Mixolydian scale with a lowered 9th (2nd) and lowered 13th (6th), used in secondary dominant chord scales for V^{7}/III and V^{7}/VI.

== Construction ==
Built on C, the scale is as follows.

When related to the scale degrees of the major scale, it reads:

1 – ♭2 – 3 – 4 – 5 – ♭6 – ♭7 – 1

The sequence of steps forming the Phrygian dominant scale is:

- half – augmented second – half – whole – half – whole – whole

== Traditional use ==
This scale occurs in Indian, Middle Eastern, Balkan, Greek music, Eastern European, Central Asian, and flamenco music. It is also present in Arabic and Egyptian music, in which it is called Hijaz maqam, and is also frequently used in the recitation of the Quran, the holy book of Islam. The scale is used in Hebrew prayers and Klezmer music as well, where it is known as Ahava Rabbah, Freygish or just the "Jewish scale", and is called Dastgāh-e Homayun in Iran. It is the most common scale in North Indian classical raga Hijaz Bhairav (Basant Mukhari) and South Indian raga Vakulabharanam.

It is sometimes called the Spanish Phrygian scale, Spanish Gypsy scale (see: gypsy scale) or Phrygian major scale (see: phrygian mode and major scale) and is common in flamenco music. It can also be found in traditional Spanish songs outside flamenco, everywhere in Spain to varying amounts, but especially in southern and central areas of the country, often being also known as escala andaluza (Andalusian scale) in Spanish. Related scales in Spanish traditional music with chromatic notes in the second degree, varying between a semitone and a tone, are also known as "gama española" ("Spanish gamut") or "gama de Castilla y León" (gamut of Castile and León) and, though found all over Spain, are particularly common in Castilian and Leonese traditional songs.

The flatted second and the augmented second between the second and third scale degrees of the scale create its distinctive sound. Examples include some versions of "Hava Nagila", "Sha Shtil" and "Misirlou", while other versions of those melodies use the closely related "double harmonic scale". The main chords derived from this scale are I, ♭II, iv, and vii.

When the Freygish scale is used in Klezmer music, the sixth degree may be left unflatted if it is melodically approached and left from above, or the seventh degree may be raised as well.

The Phrygian dominant scale is often used in jazz composition and improvisation over secondary dominants of minor chords in a major key, such as the VI^{7} chord in a VI^{7}-ii^{7}-V^{7}-I progression. Some modal jazz compositions, such as "Nardis" by Miles Davis, are composed in the Phrygian dominant mode.

== See also ==
- Hungarian minor scale
- Ukrainian Dorian scale
- Flamenco mode
- Mixolydian mode#Moloch scale
- Neapolitan chord
