= Locrian mode =

Musical mode

The Locrian mode is the seventh mode of the diatonic scale. On the C diatonic it starts with B and uses only the white keys up to the next B which is one octave higher. Its ascending form consists of the tonic, half step, whole step, whole step, half step, whole step, whole step, whole step.

== History ==
Locrian is the word used to describe an ancient Greek tribe that inhabited the three regions of Locris. Although the term occurs in several classical authors on music theory, including Cleonides (as an octave species) and Athenaeus (as an obsolete harmonia), there is no warrant for the modern use of Locrian as equivalent to Glarean's hyperaeolian mode, in either classical, Renaissance, or later phases of modal theory through the 18th century, or modern scholarship on ancient Greek musical theory and practice.

The name first came into use in modal chant theory after the 18th century, when Locrian was used to describe the newly numbered mode 11, with its final on B, ambitus from that note to the octave above, and semitones therefore between the first and second, and between the fourth and fifth degrees. Its reciting tone (or tenor) is G, its mediant D, and it has two participants: E and F. The final, as its name implies, is the tone on which the chant eventually settles, and corresponds to the tonic in tonal music. The reciting tone is the tone around which the melody principally centers, the term mediant is named from its position between the final tone and the reciting tone, and the participant is an auxiliary note, generally adjacent to the mediant in authentic modes and, in the plagal forms, coincident with the reciting tone of the corresponding authentic mode.

== Modern Locrian ==
In modern practice, the Locrian may be considered to be one of the modern minor scales: The natural minor with the step before second and the fifth scale degrees reduced from a tone to a semitone. The Locrian mode may also be considered to be a scale beginning on the seventh scale degree of any Ionian, or modern natural major scale. The Locrian mode has the formula: 1, ^{♭}2, ^{♭}3, 4, ^{♭}5, ^{♭}6, ^{♭}7.

The chord progression for Locrian starting on B is B_{dim 5}, C^{Maj}, D_{min}, E_{min}, F^{Maj}, G^{Maj}, A_{min}. Its tonic chord is a diminished triad (B_{dim} = B^{dim 5}_{min 3} = _{B}D^{F}, in the Locrian mode using the white-key diatonic scale with starting note B, corresponding to a C major scale starting on its 7th tone). This mode's diminished fifth and the Lydian mode's augmented fourth are the only modes that contain a tritone as a note in their modal scale.

== Overview ==
The Locrian mode is the only modern diatonic mode in which the tonic triad is a diminished chord (flattened fifth), which is considered very dissonant. This is because the interval between the root and fifth of the chord is a diminished fifth. For example, the tonic triad of B Locrian is made from the notes B, D, F. The root is B and the dim 5th is F. The diminished-fifth interval between them is the cause for the chord's dissonance.

The name "Locrian" is borrowed from music theory of ancient Greece. What is now called the Locrian mode, however, was what the Greeks called the diatonic Mixolydian tonos. The Greeks used the term "Locrian" as an alternative name for their "Hypodorian", or "common" tonos, with a scale running from mese to nete hyperbolaion, which in its diatonic genus corresponds to the modern Aeolian mode.

In his reform of modal theory, Glarean named this division of the octave "hyperaeolian" and printed some musical examples (a three-part polyphonic example specially commissioned from his friend Sixtus Dietrich, and the Christe from the Missa de Sancto Antonio by Pierre de la Rue), although he did not accept hyperaeolian as one of his twelve modes.

The term "Locrian" as equivalent to Glarean's hyperaeolian or the ancient Greek (diatonic) mixolydian, however, was not used until the 19th century.

== Use ==
=== Use in classical music ===
There are brief passages in classical, especially orchestral, works that have been regarded as using the Locrian mode:

- Sergei Rachmaninoff (Prelude in B minor, op. 32, no. 10).
- Paul Hindemith (Ludus Tonalis).
- Jean Sibelius (Symphony No. 4 in A minor, op. 63).
- Claude Debussy's Jeux has three extended passages in the Locrian mode.
- Paul Hindemith's "Turandot Scherzo", the theme of the second movement of Symphonic Metamorphosis of Themes by Carl Maria von Weber (1943) alternates sections in mixolydian and Locrian modes, ending in Locrian.
- Benjamin Britten used the Locrian mode for "In Freezing Winter's Night", the ninth song in A Ceremony of Carols.
- Evan Bennett, an American composer, composed his Gnossienne No. 1 in F Locrian in the Locrian mode, in homage to Erik Satie's Gnossienne No. 1 (ca. 1890).

=== Use in folk and popular music ===
The Locrian mode is almost never used in folk or popular music:

"In practical terms it should be said that few rock songs that use modes such as the Phrygian, Lydian, or Locrian actually maintain a harmony rigorously fixed on them. What usually happens is that the scale is harmonized in [chords with perfect] fifths and the riffs are then played [over] those [chords]."

Among the very few instances of folk and popular music in the Locrian mode:

- The Locrian is used in Middle Eastern music as maqam Lami. In 24 TET, it is possible to create 12 TET scales, and Lami has the same intervals as Locrian.
- Slipknot's track "Everything Ends" uses an A Locrian scale with the fourth note sometimes flattened. Numerous other tracks by Slipknot use Locrian mode as well such as "The Shape", "I Am Hated", "Left Behind", "New Abortion", and "Duality".
- English folk musician John Kirkpatrick's song "Dust to Dust" was written in the Locrian mode, backed by his concertina. The Locrian mode is not at all traditional in English music, but was used by Kirkpatrick as a musical innovation.
- Björk's "Army of Me" is dominated by a heavy bassline in C Locrian.
- The song "Gliese 710" from King Gizzard & the Lizard Wizard's 2022 album Ice, Death, Planets, Lungs, Mushrooms and Lava is in Locrian, following the album's theme of basing each song around one of the Greek modes.
- Gojira uses this mode on a few songs such as "From Mars" and "Oroborus", both use an E Locrian scale.
- Locrian mode is used in many places on the album The Last Will and Testament by Opeth.
