= F (musical note) =

Musical note

F is a musical note, the fourth above C or fifth below C. It is the fourth note and the sixth semitone of the solfège. It is also known as fa in fixed-do solfège. It is enharmonic equivalent with E♯ (E-sharp) and G (G-double flat), amongst others.

When calculated in equal temperament with a reference of A above middle C as 440 Hz, the frequency of Middle F (F_{4}) is approximately 349.228 Hz. See pitch (music) for a discussion of historical variations in frequency.

== Designation by octave ==
Scientific designation	Helmholtz designation	Octave name	Frequency (Hz)	MIDI note number
F_{−1}	F͵͵͵ or ͵͵͵F or FFFF	Octocontra	10.913	5
F_{0}	F͵͵ or ͵͵F or FFF	Subcontra	21.827	17
F_{1}	F͵ or ͵F or FF	Contra	43.654	29
F_{2}	F	Great	87.307	41
F_{3}	f	Small	174.614	53
F_{4}	f′	One-lined	349.228	65
F_{5}	f′′	Two-lined	698.456	77
F_{6}	f′′′	Three-lined	1396.913	89
F_{7}	f′′′′	Four-lined	2793.826	101
F_{8}	f′′′′′	Five-lined	5587.652	113
F_{9}	f′′′′′′	Six-lined	11175.303	125
F_{10}	f′′′′′′′	Seven-lined	22350.607	N/A

== Scales ==
=== Common scales beginning on F ===
- F major: F G A B♭ C D E F
- F natural minor: F G A♭ B♭ C D♭ E♭ F
- F harmonic minor: F G A♭ B♭ C D♭ E F
- F melodic minor ascending: F G A♭ B♭ C D E F
- F melodic minor descending: F E♭ D♭ C B♭ A♭ G F

=== Diatonic scales ===
- F Ionian: F G A B♭ C D E F
- F Dorian: F G A♭ B♭ C D E♭ F
- F Phrygian: F G♭ A♭ B♭ C D♭ E♭ F
- F Lydian: F G A B C D E F
- F Mixolydian: F G A B♭ C D E♭ F
- F Aeolian: F G A♭ B♭ C D♭ E♭ F
- F Locrian: F G♭ A♭ B♭ C♭ D♭ E♭ F

=== Jazz melodic minor ===
- F ascending melodic minor: F G A♭ B♭ C D E F
- F Dorian ♭2: F G♭ A♭ B♭ C D E♭ F
- F Lydian augmented: F G A B C♯ D E F
- F Lydian dominant: F G A B C D E♭ F
- F Mixolydian ♭6: F G A B♭ C D♭ E♭ F
- F Locrian ♮2: F G A♭ B♭ C♭ D♭ E♭ F
- F altered: F G♭ A♭ B C♭ D♭ E♭ F

== E-sharp ==
E♯ (German: Eis) is a common enharmonic equivalent of F, but is not regarded as the same note. E♯ is commonly found before F♯ in the same measure in pieces where F♯ is in the key signature, in order to represent a diatonic, rather than a chromatic semitone; writing an F♮ with a following F♯ is regarded as a chromatic alteration of one scale degree. Though E♯ and F♮ sound the same in any 12-tone temperament, other tunings may define them as distinct pitches.

== See also ==
- Piano key frequencies
- F major
- F minor
- Root (chord)
Notes of the chromatic scale
C
(B♯)
C♯
D♭
D
D♯
E♭
E
(F♭)
F
(E♯)
F♯
G♭
G
G♯
A♭
A
A♯
B♭
B
(C♭)
