= C (musical note) =

Note in western music

C or Do is the first note of the C major scale, the third note of the A minor scale (the relative minor of C major), and the fourth note (G, A, B, C) of the Guidonian hand, commonly pitched around 261.63 Hz. The actual frequency has depended on historical pitch standards, and for transposing instruments a distinction is made between written and sounding or concert pitch. It has enharmonic equivalents of B♯ and D.

In English the term Do is used interchangeably with C only in the context of fixed Do solfège; in the movable Do system Do refers to the tonic of the prevailing key.

== Frequency ==
Historically, concert pitch has varied. For an instrument in equal temperament tuned to the A440 pitch standard widely adopted in 1939, middle C has a frequency around 261.63 Hz (for other notes see piano key frequencies). Scientific pitch was originally proposed in 1713 by French physicist Joseph Sauveur and based on the numerically convenient frequency of 256 Hz for middle C, all C's being powers of two. After the A440 pitch standard was adopted by musicians, the Acoustical Society of America published new frequency tables for scientific use. A movement to restore the older A435 standard has used the banners "Verdi tuning", "philosophical pitch" or the easily confused scientific pitch.

== Octave nomenclature ==
=== Middle C ===
Middle C centrally set on a grand staff

Middle C (the fourth C key from left on a standard 88-key piano keyboard) is designated C_{4} in scientific pitch notation, c′ in Helmholtz pitch notation, and note number 60 in the MIDI standard.

While the expression middle C is generally clear across instruments and clefs, some musicians naturally use the term to refer to the C note in the middle of their specific instrument's range. C_{4} (approximately 261.626 Hz) may be called Low C by someone playing a Western concert flute, which has a higher and narrower playing range than the piano, while C_{5} (523.251 Hz) would be middle C. This practice has led some to encourage standardizing on C_{4} as the definitive middle C in instructional materials across all instruments.

On the grand staff, middle C is notated with a ledger line above the top line of the bass staff or below the bottom line of the treble staff. Alternatively, it is written on the centre line of a staff using the alto clef, or on the fourth line from the bottom, or the second line from the top, of staves using the tenor clef.

=== Other octaves ===
In vocal music, the term High C (sometimes called Top C) can refer to either the soprano's C_{6} (1046.502 Hz; c′′′ in Helmholtz notation) or the tenor's C_{5}; soprano written as the C two ledger lines above the treble clef, with the tenor voice the space above concert A, sung an octave lower. Sometimes written with “8v” below the treble, to represent the octave (8 tones in a major scale).

Tenor C is an organ builder's term for small C or C_{3} (130.813 Hz), the note one octave below middle C. In older stoplists it usually means that a rank was not yet full compass, omitting the bottom octave, until that octave was added later on.

== Designation by octave ==
Scientific designation	Helmholtz designation	Octave name	Frequency (using A 440 equal temperament)	MIDI note number	Other names	Audio
C_{−1}	C͵͵͵ or ͵͵͵C or CCCC	Octocontra	8.176 Hz	0	Quadruple Low C (64 ft. organ pipes)	
C_{0}	C͵͵ or ͵͵C or CCC	Subcontra	16.352 Hz	12	Triple Low C (32 ft. organ pipes), Octobass C	
C_{1}	C͵ or ͵C or CC	Contra	32.703 Hz	24	Double Low C (16 ft. organ pipes), Double Bass w/ either Low C Extension, 5 Strings, or in 5ths Tuning	
C_{2}	C	Great	65.406 Hz	36	Low C, cello C, 8′ C (see organ pipe length)	
C_{3}	c	Small	130.813 Hz	48	4′ C or Tenor C (organ), viola C, Tenor Middle C (Tenor Voice)	
C_{4}	c′	One-lined	261.626 Hz	60	Middle C for Sopranos, 2 ft. organ pipes	
C_{5}	c′′	Two-lined	523.251 Hz	72	Treble C, Tenor High C (written an octave higher for tenor voices), 1 ft. organ pipes	
C_{6}	c′′′	Three-lined	1046.502 Hz	84	High C (soprano)	
C_{7}	c′′′′	Four-lined	2093.005 Hz	96	Double high C	
C_{8}	c′′′′′	Five-lined	4186.009 Hz	108	Eighth octave C, triple high C	
C_{9}	c′′′′′′	Six-lined	8372.018 Hz	120	Quadruple high C	
C_{10}	c′′′′′′′	Seven-lined	16744.036 Hz	N/A	Quintuple high C	

== Graphic presentation ==
Middle C in four clefs
Position of middle C on a standard 88-key keyboard

== Scales ==
=== Common scales beginning on C ===
- C major: C D E F G A B C′
- C natural minor: C D E♭ F G A♭ B♭ C′
- C harmonic minor: C D E♭ F G A♭ B C′
- C melodic minor ascending: C D E♭ F G A B C′
- C melodic minor descending: C′ B♭ A♭ G F E♭ D C

=== Diatonic scales ===
- C Ionian: C D E F G A B C′
- C Dorian: C D E♭ F G A B♭ C′
- C Phrygian: C D♭ E♭ F G A♭ B♭ C′
- C Lydian: C D E F♯ G A B C′
- C Mixolydian: C D E F G A B♭ C′
- C Aeolian: C D E♭ F G A♭ B♭ C′
- C Locrian: C D♭ E♭ F G♭ A♭ B♭ C′

=== Jazz melodic minor ===
- C ascending melodic minor: C D E♭ F G A B C′
- C Dorian ♭2: C D♭ E♭ F G A B♭ C′
- C Lydian augmented: C D E F♯ G♯ A B C′
- C Lydian dominant: C D E F♯ G A B♭ C′
- C Mixolydian ♭6: C D E F G A♭ B♭ C′
- C Locrian ♮2: C D E♭ F G♭ A♭ B♭ C′
- C altered: C D♭ E♭ F♭ G♭ A♭ B♭ C′

== See also ==
- Piano key frequencies
- A440 (pitch standard)
- C major
- C minor
- Root (chord)
