= Dorian flat 2 scale =

Second mode of the melodic minor scale

Dorian ♭2
- Modes: I, II, III, IV, V, VI, VII

Component pitches
- C, D♭, E♭, F, G, A, B♭

Qualities
- Number of pitch classes: 7
- Forte number: 7-34
- Complement: 5-34

The Dorian ♭2 scale (pronounced "Dorian flat two"), also known as the Phrygian ♮6 scale (Phrygian sharp six), or the Javanese scale is the second mode of the jazz minor scale (or the ascending melodic minor scale). It is on the second degree of the jazz minor scale. Without the minor second above the root, the scale would just be the Dorian mode. The reason it is also known as Phrygian ♮6 is because if the scale did not have the major 6th then it would be enharmonic with the Phrygian mode.

This scale is commonly used in Assyrian music, most especially in the folk dance genre. Thought to add color and to retain the Phrygian tradition of Assyrian music, the major sixth may at times be simultaneously altered to the minor sixth during the course of the composition.

== See also ==
- Jazz scale
