= Dominant scale =

In music, the dominant scale is:

- Mixolydian mode

Dominant scale may also refer to:

- Phrygian dominant scale
- Lydian dominant scale
- altered dominant scale (a jazz scale), or
- the bebop dominant scale
