= Mode (music) =

Type of musical scale and characteristic behaviors

Diatonic major scale (Ionian mode, I) on C, a "white note" scale
The modern (diatonic) modes on C

In music theory, the term mode or modus is used in a number of distinct senses, depending on context.

Its most common use may be described as a type of musical scale coupled with a set of characteristic melodic and harmonic behaviors. It is applied to major and minor keys as well as the seven diatonic modes (including the former as Ionian and Aeolian) which are defined by their starting note or tonic. (Olivier Messiaen's modes of limited transposition are strictly a scale type.) Related to the diatonic modes are the eight church modes or Gregorian modes, in which authentic and plagal forms of scales are distinguished by ambitus and tenor or reciting tone. Although both diatonic and Gregorian modes borrow terminology from ancient Greece, the Greek tonoi do not otherwise resemble their medieval/modern counterparts.

Previously, in the Middle Ages the term modus was used to describe intervals, individual notes, and rhythms (see § Mode as a general concept). Modal rhythm was an essential feature of the modal notation system of the Notre-Dame school at the turn of the 12th century. In the mensural notation that emerged later, modus specifies the subdivision of the longa.

Outside of Western classical music, "mode" is sometimes used to embrace similar concepts such as Octoechos, maqam, pathet etc. (see § Analogues in different musical traditions below).

== Mode as a general concept ==
Regarding the concept of mode as applied to pitch relationships generally, in 2001 Harold S. Powers proposed that "mode" has "a twofold sense", denoting either a "particularized scale" or a "generalized tune", or both:

"If one thinks of scale and tune as representing the poles of a continuum of melodic predetermination, then most of the area between can be designated one way or the other as being in the domain of mode."

In 1792, Sir Willam Jones applied the term "mode" to the music of "the Persians and the Hindoos". As early as 1271, Amerus applied the concept to cantilenis organicis (lit. "organic songs", most probably meaning "polyphony"). It is still heavily used with regard to Western polyphony before the onset of the common practice period, as for example "modale Mehrstimmigkeit" by Carl Dahlhaus or "Alte Tonarten" of the 16th and 17th centuries found by Bernhard Meier.

The word encompasses several additional meanings. Authors from the 9th century until the early 18th century (e.g., Guido of Arezzo) sometimes employed the Latin modus for interval, or for qualities of individual notes. In the theory of late-medieval mensural polyphony (e.g., Franco of Cologne), modus is a rhythmic relationship between long and short values or a pattern made from them; in mensural music most often theorists applied it to division of longa into 3 or 2 breves.

== Modes and scales ==
A musical scale is a series of pitches in a distinct order.

The concept of "mode" in Western music theory has three successive stages: in Gregorian chant theory, in Renaissance polyphonic theory, and in tonal harmonic music of the common practice period. In all three contexts, "mode" incorporates the idea of the diatonic scale, but differs from it by also involving an element of melody type. This concerns particular repertories of short musical figures or groups of tones within a certain scale so that, depending on the point of view, mode takes on the meaning of either a "particularized scale" or a "generalized tune". Modern musicological practice has extended the concept of mode to earlier musical systems, such as those of Ancient Greek music, Jewish cantillation, and the Byzantine system of octoechoi, as well as to other non-Western types of music.

By the early 19th century, the word "mode" had taken on an additional meaning, in reference to the difference between major and minor keys, specified as "major mode" and "minor mode". At the same time, composers were beginning to conceive "modality" as something outside of the major/minor system that could be used to evoke religious feelings or to suggest folk-music idioms.

== Greek modes ==
Early Greek treatises describe three interrelated concepts that are related to the later, medieval idea of "mode": (1) scales (or "systems"), (2) tonos – pl. tonoi – (the more usual term used in medieval theory for what later came to be called "mode"), and (3) harmonia (harmony) – pl. harmoniai – this third term subsuming the corresponding tonoi but not necessarily the converse.

=== Greek scales ===
The three genera of the Dorian octave species on E

The Greek scales in the Aristoxenian tradition were:

Aristoxenian scale	rough modern pitch	Aristoxenus' description
Mixolydian	b–b′	hypate hypaton–paramese
Lydian	c′–c″	parhypate hypaton–trite diezeugmenon
Phrygian	d′–d″	lichanos hypaton–paranete diezeugmenon
Dorian	e′–e″	hypate meson–nete diezeugmenon
Hypolydian	f′–f″	parhypate meson–trite hyperbolaion
Hypophrygian	g′–g″	lichanos meson–paranete hyperbolaion
Common, Locrian, or Hypodorian	a′–a″ or a–a′	mese–nete hyperbolaion or proslambnomenos–mese

These names are derived from ancient Greeks' cultural subgroups (Dorians), small regions in central Greece (Locris), and certain Anatolian peoples (Lydia, Phrygia) (not ethnically Greek, but in close contact with them). The association of these ethnic names with the octave species appears to precede Aristoxenus, who criticized their application to the tonoi by the earlier theorists whom he called the "Harmonicists". According to Bélis (2001), he felt that their diagrams, which exhibit 28 consecutive dieses, were

"... devoid of any musical reality since more than two quarter-tones are never heard in succession."

Depending on the positioning (spacing) of the interposed tones in the tetrachords, three genera of the seven octave species can be recognized. The diatonic genus (composed of tones and semitones), the chromatic genus (semitones and a minor third), and the enharmonic genus (with a major third and two quarter tones or dieses). The framing interval of the perfect fourth is fixed, while the two internal pitches are movable. Within the basic forms, the intervals of the chromatic and diatonic genera were varied further by three and two "shades" (chroai), respectively.

In contrast to the medieval modal system, these scales and their related tonoi and harmoniai appear to have had no hierarchical relationships amongst the notes that could establish contrasting points of tension and rest, although the mese ("middle note") might have functioned as some sort of central, returning tone for the melody.

=== Tonoi ===
The term tonos (pl. tonoi) was used in four senses:

"as note, interval, region of the voice, and pitch. We use it of the region of the voice whenever we speak of Dorian, or Phrygian, or Lydian, or any of the other tones".

Cleonides attributes thirteen tonoi to Aristoxenus, which represent a progressive transposition of the entire system (or scale) by semitone over the range of an octave between the Hypodorian and the Hypermixolydian. According to Cleonides, Aristoxenus's transpositional tonoi were named analogously to the octave species, supplemented with new terms to raise the number of degrees from seven to thirteen. However, according to the interpretation of at least three modern authorities, in these transpositional tonoi the Hypodorian is the lowest, and the Mixolydian next-to-highest – the reverse of the case of the octave species, with nominal base pitches as follows (descending order):

nominal modern base	Aristoxenian school name
F	Hypermixolydian (or Hyperphrygian)
E	High Mixolydian or Hyperiastian
E^{♭}	Low Mixolydian or Hyperdorian
D	Lydian
C^{♯}	Low Lydian or Aeolian
C	Phrygian
B	Low Phrygian or Iastian
B^{♭}	Dorian
A	Hypolydian
G^{♯}	Low Hypolydian or Hypoaeolian
G	Hypophrygian
F^{♯}	Low Hypophrygian or Hypoiastian
F	Hypodorian

Ptolemy, in his Harmonics, ii.3–11, construed the tonoi differently, presenting all seven octave species within a fixed octave, through chromatic inflection of the scale degrees (comparable to the modern conception of building all seven modal scales on a single tonic). In Ptolemy's system, therefore there are only seven tonoi. Pythagoras also construed the intervals arithmetically (if somewhat more rigorously, initially allowing for 1:1 = Unison, 2:1 = Octave, 3:2 = Fifth, 4:3 = Fourth and 5:4 = Major Third within the octave). In their diatonic genus, these tonoi and corresponding harmoniai correspond with the intervals of the familiar modern major and minor scales. See Pythagorean tuning and Pythagorean interval.

=== Harmoniai ===
Harmoniai of the School of Eratocles (enharmonic genus)
Mixolydian	1/4	1/4	2	1/4	1/4	2	1
Lydian	1/4	2	1/4	1/4	2	1	1/4
Phrygian	2	1/4	1/4	2	1	1/4	1/4
Dorian	1/4	1/4	2	1	1/4	1/4	2
Hypolydian	1/4	2	1	1/4	1/4	2	1/4
Hypophrygian	2	1	1/4	1/4	2	1/4	1/4
Hypodorian	1	1/4	1/4	2	1/4	1/4	2

In music theory the Greek word harmonia can signify the enharmonic genus of tetrachord, the seven octave species, or a style of music associated with one of the ethnic types or the tonoi named by them.

Particularly in the earliest surviving writings, harmonia is regarded not as a scale, but as the epitome of the stylised singing of a particular district or people or occupation. When the late-6th-century poet Lasus of Hermione referred to the Aeolian harmonia, for example, he was more likely thinking of a melodic style characteristic of Greeks speaking the Aeolic dialect than of a scale pattern. By the late 5th century BC, these regional types are being described in terms of differences in what is called harmonia – a word with several senses, but here referring to the pattern of intervals between the notes sounded by the strings of a lyra or a kithara.

However, there is no reason to suppose that, at this time, these tuning patterns stood in any straightforward and organised relations to one another. It was only around the year 400 that attempts were made by a group of theorists known as the harmonicists to bring these harmoniai into a single system and to express them as orderly transformations of a single structure. Eratocles was the most prominent of the harmonicists, though his ideas are known only at second hand, through Aristoxenus, from whom we learn they represented the harmoniai as cyclic reorderings of a given series of intervals within the octave, producing seven octave species. We also learn that Eratocles confined his descriptions to the enharmonic genus.

=== Philosophical harmoniai in Plato and Aristotle ===
In the Republic, Plato uses the term inclusively to encompass a particular type of scale, range and register, characteristic rhythmic pattern, textual subject, etc. Plato held that playing music in a particular harmonia would incline one towards specific behaviors associated with it, and suggested that soldiers should listen to music in Dorian or Phrygian harmoniai to help harden them but avoid music in Lydian, Mixolydian, or Ionian harmoniai, for fear of being softened. Plato believed that a change in the musical modes of the state would cause a wide-scale social revolution.

The philosophical writings of Plato and Aristotle (c. 350 BC) include sections that describe the effect of different harmoniai on mood and character formation. For example, Aristotle stated in his Politics:

But melodies themselves do contain imitations of character. This is perfectly clear, for the harmoniai have quite distinct natures from one another, so that those who hear them are differently affected and do not respond in the same way to each. To some, such as the one called Mixolydian, they respond with more grief and anxiety, to others, such as the relaxed harmoniai, with more mellowness of mind, and to one another with a special degree of moderation and firmness, Dorian being apparently the only one of the harmoniai to have this effect, while Phrygian creates ecstatic excitement. These points have been well expressed by those who have thought deeply about this kind of education; for they cull the evidence for what they say from the facts themselves.

Aristotle continues by describing the effects of rhythm, and concludes about the combined effect of rhythm and harmonia (viii:1340b:10–13):

From all this it is clear that music is capable of creating a particular quality of character [ἦθος] in the soul, and if it can do that, it is plain that it should be made use of, and that the young should be educated in it.

The word ethos (ἦθος) in this context means "moral character", and Greek ethos theory concerns the ways that music can convey, foster, and even generate ethical states.

=== Melos ===
Some treatises also describe "melic" composition (μελοποιΐα), "the employment of the materials subject to harmonic practice with due regard to the requirements of each of the subjects under consideration" – which, together with the scales, tonoi, and harmoniai resemble elements found in medieval modal theory. According to Aristides Quintilianus, melic composition is subdivided into three classes: dithyrambic, nomic, and tragic. These parallel his three classes of rhythmic composition: systaltic, diastaltic and hesychastic. Each of these broad classes of melic composition may contain various subclasses, such as erotic, comic and panegyric, and any composition might be elevating (diastaltic), depressing (systaltic), or soothing (hesychastic).

According to Thomas J. Mathiesen, music as a performing art was called melos, which in its perfect form (μέλος τέλειον) comprised not only the melody and the text (including its elements of rhythm and diction) but also stylized dance movement. Melic and rhythmic composition (respectively, μελοποιΐα and ῥυθμοποιΐα) were the processes of selecting and applying the various components of melos and rhythm to create a complete work. According to Aristides Quintilianus:

And we might fairly speak of perfect melos, for it is necessary that melody, rhythm and diction be considered so that the perfection of the song may be produced: in the case of melody, simply a certain sound; in the case of rhythm, a motion of sound; and in the case of diction, the meter. The things contingent to perfect melos are motion-both of sound and body-and also chronoi and the rhythms based on these.

== Western Church ==
=== Early theorists ===
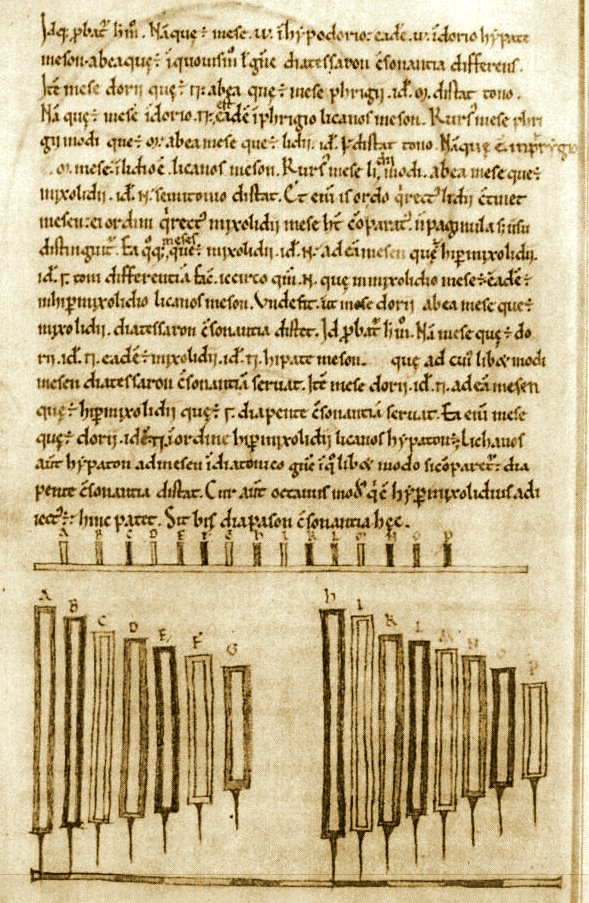
Excerpt from Boethius' De musica depicting a scale

The oldest medieval treatise regarding modes is Musica disciplina by Aurelian of Réôme (dating from around 850) while Hermannus Contractus was the first to define modes as partitionings of the octave. However, the earliest Western source using the system of eight modes is the Tonary of St Riquier, dated between about 795 and 800.

Tonaries, lists of chant titles grouped by mode, appear in western sources around the turn of the 9th century. The influence of developments in Byzantium, from Jerusalem and Damascus, for instance the works of Saints John of Damascus (d. 749) and Cosmas of Maiouma, are still not fully understood. The eight-fold division of the Latin modal system, in a four-by-two matrix, was certainly of Eastern provenance, originating probably in Syria or even in Jerusalem, and was transmitted from Byzantine sources to Carolingian practice and theory during the 8th century. However, the earlier Greek model for the Carolingian system was probably ordered like the later Byzantine oktōēchos, that is, with the four principal (authentic) modes first, then the four plagals, whereas the Latin modes were always grouped the other way, with the authentics and plagals paired.

The 6th-century scholar Boethius had translated Greek music theory treatises by Nicomachus and Ptolemy into Latin. Later authors created confusion by applying mode as described by Boethius to explain plainchant modes, which were a wholly different system. In his De institutione musica, book 4 chapter 15, Boethius, like his Hellenistic sources, twice used the term harmonia to describe what would likely correspond to the later notion of "mode", but also used the word "modus" – probably translating the Greek word τρόπος (tropos), which he also rendered as Latin tropus – in connection with the system of transpositions required to produce seven diatonic octave species, so the term was simply a means of describing transposition and had nothing to do with the church modes.

Later, 9th-century theorists applied Boethius's terms tropus and modus (along with "tonus") to the system of church modes. The treatise De Musica (or De harmonica institutione) of Hucbald synthesized the three previously disparate strands of modal theory: chant theory, the Byzantine oktōēchos and Boethius's account of Hellenistic theory. The late-9th- and early 10th-century compilation known as the Alia musica imposed the seven octave transpositions, known as tropus and described by Boethius, onto the eight church modes, but its compilator also mentions the Greek (Byzantine) echoi translated by the Latin term sonus. Thus, the names of the modes became associated with the eight church tones and their modal formulas – but this medieval interpretation does not fit the concept of the ancient Greek harmonics treatises. The modern understanding of mode does not reflect that it is made of different concepts that do not all fit.

Carl Dahlhaus lists "three factors that form the respective starting points for the modal theories of Aurelian of Réôme, Hermannus Contractus, and Guido of Arezzo":

- the relation of modal formulas to the comprehensive system of tonal relationships embodied in the diatonic scale
- the partitioning of the octave into a modal framework
- the function of the modal final as a relational center.

=== Gregorian modes ===
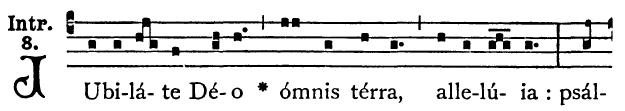
The introit Jubilate Deo, from which Jubilate Sunday gets its name, is in Mode 8.

According to Carolingian theorists the eight church modes, or Gregorian modes, can be divided into four pairs, where each pair shares the "final" note and the four notes above the final, but they have different intervals concerning the species of the fifth. If the octave is completed by adding three notes above the fifth, the mode is termed authentic, but if the octave is completed by adding three notes below, it is called plagal (from Greek πλάγιος, "oblique, sideways"). In both cases, the strict ambitus of the mode is one octave. A melody that remains confined to the mode's ambitus is called "perfect"; if it falls short of it, "imperfect"; if it exceeds it, "superfluous"; and a melody that combines the ambituses of both the plagal and authentic is said to be in a "mixed mode".

Although the earlier (Greek) model for the Carolingian system was probably ordered like the Byzantine oktōēchos, with the four authentic modes first, followed by the four plagals, the earliest extant sources for the Latin system are organized in four pairs of authentic and plagal modes sharing the same final: protus authentic/plagal, deuterus authentic/plagal, tritus authentic/plagal, and tetrardus authentic/plagal.

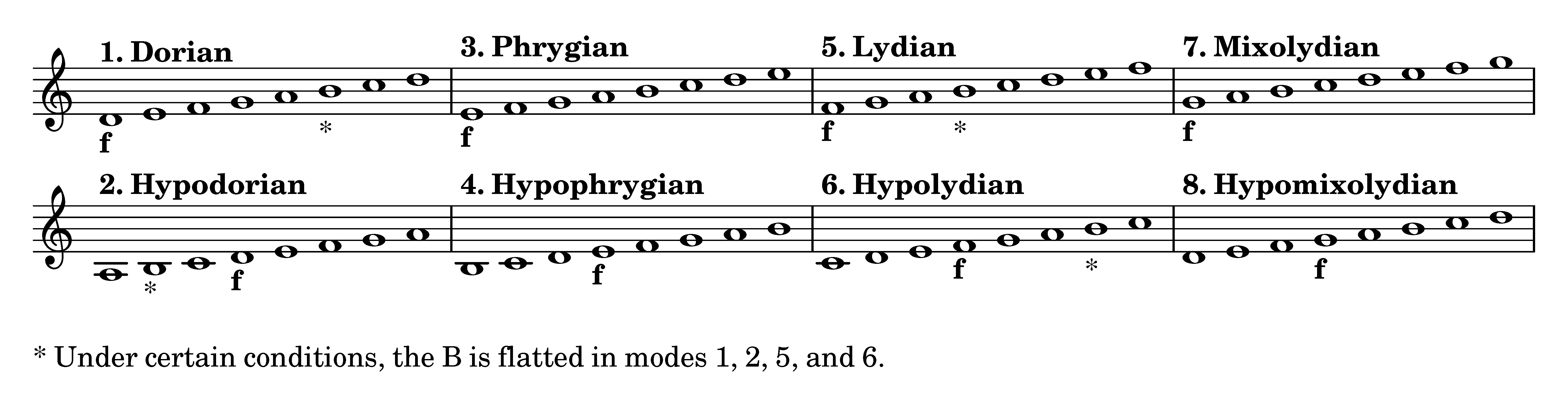
The eight musical modes. f indicates "final".

Each mode has, in addition to its final, a "reciting tone", sometimes called the "dominant". It is also sometimes called the "tenor", from Latin tenere "to hold", meaning the tone around which the melody principally centres. The reciting tones of all authentic modes began a fifth above the final, with those of the plagal modes a third above. However, the reciting tones of modes 3, 4, and 8 rose one step during the 10th and 11th centuries with 3 and 8 moving from B to C (half step) and that of 4 moving from G to A (whole step).

Kyrie "orbis factor", in mode 1 (Dorian) with B♭ on scale-degree 6, descends from the reciting tone, A, to the final, D, and uses the subtonium (tone below the final).

After the reciting tone, every mode is distinguished by scale degrees called "mediant" and "participant". The mediant is named from its position between the final and reciting tone. In the authentic modes it is the third of the scale, unless that note should happen to be B, in which case C substitutes for it. In the plagal modes, its position is somewhat irregular. The participant is an auxiliary note, generally adjacent to the mediant in authentic modes and, in the plagal forms, coincident with the reciting tone of the corresponding authentic mode (some modes have a second participant).

Only one accidental is used commonly in Gregorian chant – B may be lowered by a half-step to B♭. This usually (but not always) occurs in modes V and VI, as well as in the upper tetrachord of IV, and is optional in other modes except III, VII and VIII.

Mode	I (Dorian)	II (Hypodorian)	III (Phrygian)	IV (Hypophrygian)	V (Lydian)	VI (Hypolydian)	VII (Mixolydian)	VIII (Hypomixolydian)
in Italian music until 17th century	primi toni	secundi toni	terzi toni	quarti toni	quinti toni	sexti toni	septimi toni	octavi toni
Final	D (=re)	D	E (=mi)	E	F (=fa)	F	G (=sol)	G
Dominant	A (=la)	F	B (=si) or C (=do)	G or A	C	A	D	B or C

=== Later systemizations ===
In 1547, the Swiss theorist Henricus Glareanus published the Dodecachordon, in which he solidified the concept of the church modes, and added four additional modes: the Aeolian (mode 9), Hypoaeolian (mode 10), Ionian (mode 11), and Hypoionian (mode 12). A little later in the century, the Italian Gioseffo Zarlino at first adopted Glarean's system in 1558, but later (1571 and 1573) revised the numbering and naming conventions in a manner he deemed more logical, resulting in the widespread promulgation of two conflicting systems.

Zarlino's system reassigned the six pairs of authentic–plagal mode numbers to finals in the order of the natural hexachord, C–D–E–F–G–A, and transferred the Greek names as well, so that modes 1 through 8 now became C-authentic to F-plagal, and were now called by the names Dorian to Hypomixolydian. The pair of G modes were numbered 9 and 10 and were named Ionian and Hypoionian, while the pair of A modes retained both the numbers and names (11, Aeolian, and 12 Hypoaeolian) of Glarean's system. While Zarlino's system became popular in France, Italian composers preferred Glarean's scheme because it retained the traditional eight modes, while expanding them. Luzzasco Luzzaschi was an exception in Italy, in that he used Zarlino's new system.

In the late-18th and 19th centuries, some chant reformers (notably the editors of the Mechlin, Pustet-Ratisbon (Regensburg), and Rheims-Cambrai Office-Books, collectively referred to as the Cecilian Movement) renumbered the modes once again, this time retaining the original eight mode numbers and Glareanus's modes 9 and 10, but assigning numbers 11 and 12 to the modes on the final B, which they named Locrian and Hypolocrian (even while rejecting their use in chant). The Ionian and Hypoionian modes (on C) become in this system modes 13 and 14.

Given the confusion between ancient, medieval, and modern terminology, "today it is more consistent and practical to use the traditional designation of the modes with numbers one to eight", using Roman numeral (I–VIII), rather than using the pseudo-Greek naming system. Medieval terms, first used in Carolingian treatises, later in Aquitanian tonaries, are still used by scholars today: the Greek ordinals ("first", "second", etc.) transliterated into the Latin alphabet protus (πρῶτος), deuterus (δεύτερος), tritus (τρίτος), and tetrardus (τέταρτος). In practice they can be specified as authentic or as plagal like "protus authentus / plagalis".

=== Affect ===
Various interpretations of the "character" imparted by the different modes have been suggested. Three such interpretations, from Guido of Arezzo (995–1050), Adam of Fulda (1445–1505), and Juan de Espinosa Medrano (1632–1688), follow:

Name	Mode	D'Arezzo	Fulda	Espinosa	Example chant
Dorian	I	serious	any feeling	happy, taming the passions	Veni sancte spiritus
Hypodorian	II	sad	sad	serious and tearful	Iesu dulcis amor meus
Phrygian	III	mystic	vehement	inciting anger	Kyrie fons bonitatis
Hypophrygian	IV	harmonious	tender	inciting delights, tempering fierceness	Conditor alme siderum
Lydian	V	happy	happy	happy	Salve Regina (ferial tone)
Hypolydian	VI	devout	pious	tearful and pious	Ubi caritas
Mixolydian	VII	angelical	of youth	uniting pleasure and sadness	Introibo ad altare (ant.)
Hypomixolydian	VIII	perfect	of knowledge	very happy	Ad cenam agni providi

== Modern diatonic modes ==
Modern Western modes use the same set of notes as the major scale, in the same order, but starting from one of its seven degrees in turn as a tonic, and so present a different sequence of whole and half steps. With the interval sequence of the major scale being W–W–H–W–W–W–H, where "W" means a whole tone (whole step) and "H" means a semitone (half step), it is thus possible to generate the following modes:

Mode	Tonic relative to major scale	Interval sequence	Notes relative Ionian	Example
Ionian	I	W–W–H–W–W–W–H	1 - 2 - 3 - 4 - 5 - 6 - 7	C–D–E–F–G–A–B–C
Dorian	ii	W–H–W–W–W–H–W	1 - 2 - b3 - 4 - 5 - 6 - b7	D–E–F–G–A–B–C–D
Phrygian	iii	H–W–W–W–H–W–W	1 - b2 - b3 - 4 - 5 - b6 - b7	E–F–G–A–B–C–D–E
Lydian	IV	W–W–W–H–W–W–H	1 - 2 - 3 - #4 - 5 - 6 -7	F–G–A–B–C–D–E–F
Mixolydian	V	W–W–H–W–W–H–W	1 - 2 - 3 - 4 - 5 - 6 - b7	G–A–B–C–D–E–F–G
Aeolian	vi	W–H–W–W–H–W–W	1 - 2 - b3 - 4 - 5 - b6 - b7	A–B–C–D–E–F–G–A
Locrian	vii^{ø}	H–W–W–H–W–W–W	1 - b2 - b3 - 4 - b5 - b6 - b7	B–C–D–E–F–G–A–B

For the sake of simplicity, the examples shown above are formed by natural notes (also called "white notes", as they can be played using the white keys of a piano keyboard). However, any transposition of each of these scales is a valid example of the corresponding mode. In other words, transposition preserves mode.

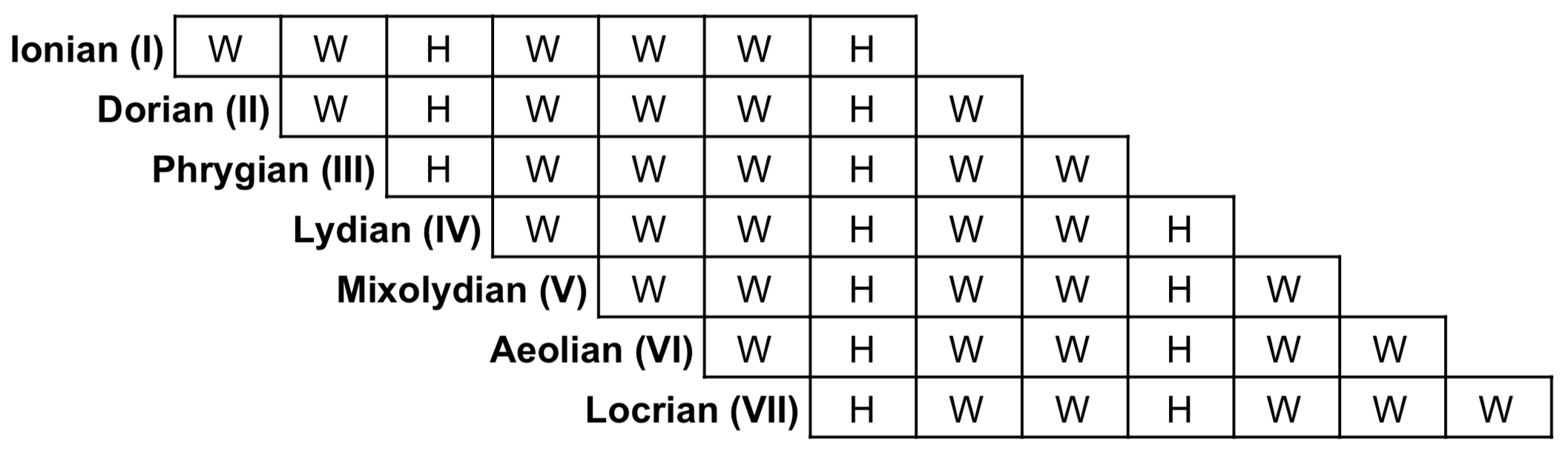
Interval sequences for each of the modern modes, showing the relationship between the modes as a shifted grid of intervals.

Although the names of the modern modes are Greek and some have names used in ancient Greek theory for some of the harmoniai, the names of the modern modes are conventional and do not refer to the sequences of intervals found even in the diatonic genus of the Greek octave species sharing the same name.

=== Analysis ===
Each mode has characteristic intervals and chords that give it its distinctive sound. The following is an analysis of each of the seven modern modes. The examples are provided in a key signature with no sharps or flats (scales composed of natural notes).

==== Ionian (I) ====
The Ionian mode is the modern major scale. The example composed of natural notes begins on C, and is also known as the C-major scale:

The modern Ionian mode on C

Natural notes	C	D	E	F	G	A	B	C
Interval from C	P1	M2	M3	P4	P5	M6	M7	P8

- Tonic triad: C major
- Tonic seventh chord: C^{M7}
- Dominant triad: G (in modern tonal thinking, the fifth or dominant scale degree, which in this case is G, is the next-most important chord root after the tonic)
- Seventh chord on the dominant: G^{7} (a dominant seventh chord, so-called because of its position in this – and only this – modal scale)

==== Dorian (II) ====
The Dorian mode is the second mode. The example composed of natural notes begins on D:

The modern Dorian mode on D

Natural notes	D	E	F	G	A	B	C	D
Interval from D	P1	M2	m3	P4	P5	M6	m7	P8

The Dorian mode is very similar to the modern natural minor scale (see Aeolian mode below). The only difference with respect to the natural minor scale is in the sixth scale degree, which is a major sixth (M6) above the tonic, rather than a minor sixth (m6).

- Tonic triad: Dm
- Tonic seventh chord: Dm^{7}
- Dominant triad: Am
- Seventh chord on the dominant: Am^{7} (a minor seventh chord)

==== Phrygian (III) ====
The Phrygian mode is the third mode. The example composed of natural notes starts on E:

The modern Phrygian mode on E

Natural notes	E	F	G	A	B	C	D	E
Interval from E	P1	m2	m3	P4	P5	m6	m7	P8

The Phrygian mode is very similar to the modern natural minor scale (see Aeolian mode below). The only difference with respect to the natural minor scale is in the second scale degree, which is a minor second (m2) above the tonic, rather than a major second (M2).

- Tonic triad: Em
- Tonic seventh chord: Em^{7}
- Dominant triad: Bdim
- Seventh chord on the dominant: B^{ø7} (a half-diminished seventh chord)

==== Lydian (IV) ====
The Lydian mode is the fourth mode. The example composed of natural notes starts on F:

The modern Lydian mode on F

Natural notes	F	G	A	B	C	D	E	F
Interval from F	P1	M2	M3	A4	P5	M6	M7	P8

The single tone that differentiates this scale from the major scale (Ionian mode) is its fourth degree, which is an augmented fourth (A4) above the tonic (F), rather than a perfect fourth (P4).

- Tonic triad: F
- Tonic seventh chord: F^{M7}
- Dominant triad: C
- Seventh chord on the dominant: C^{M7} (a major seventh chord)

==== Mixolydian (V) ====
The Mixolydian mode is the fifth mode. The example composed of natural notes begins on G:

The modern Mixolydian mode on G

Natural notes	G	A	B	C	D	E	F	G
Interval from G	P1	M2	M3	P4	P5	M6	m7	P8

The single tone that differentiates this scale from the major scale (Ionian mode) is its seventh degree, which is a minor seventh (m7) above the tonic (G), rather than a major seventh (M7). Therefore, the seventh scale degree becomes a subtonic to the tonic because it is now a whole tone lower than the tonic, in contrast to the seventh degree in the major scale, which is a semitone tone lower than the tonic (leading-tone).

- Tonic triad: G
- Tonic seventh chord: G^{7} (the dominant seventh chord in this mode is the seventh chord built on the tonic degree)
- Dominant triad: Dm
- Seventh chord on the dominant: Dm^{7} (a minor seventh chord)

==== Aeolian (VI) ====
The Aeolian mode is the sixth mode. It is also called the natural minor scale. The example composed of natural notes begins on A, and is also known as the A natural-minor scale:

The modern Aeolian mode on A

Natural notes	A	B	C	D	E	F	G	A
Interval from A	P1	M2	m3	P4	P5	m6	m7	P8

- Tonic triad: Am
- Tonic seventh chord: Am^{7}
- Dominant triad: Em
- Seventh chord on the dominant: Em^{7} (a minor seventh chord)

==== Locrian (VII) ====
The Locrian mode is the seventh mode. The example composed of natural notes begins on B:

The modern Locrian mode on B

Natural notes	B	C	D	E	F	G	A	B
Interval from B	P1	m2	m3	P4	d5	m6	m7	P8

The distinctive scale degree here is the diminished fifth (d5). This makes the tonic triad diminished, so this mode is the only one in which the chords built on the tonic and dominant scale degrees have their roots separated by a diminished, rather than perfect, fifth. Similarly the tonic seventh chord is half-diminished.

- Tonic triad: Bdim or B°
- Tonic seventh chord: Bm^{7♭5} or B^{ø7}
- Dominant triad: F
- Seventh chord on the dominant: FM^{7} (a major seventh chord)

=== Summary ===
The modes can be arranged in the following sequence, which follows the circle of fifths. In this sequence, each mode has one more lowered interval relative to the tonic than the mode preceding it. Thus, taking Lydian as reference, Ionian (major) has a lowered fourth; Mixolydian, a lowered fourth and seventh; Dorian, a lowered fourth, seventh, and third; Aeolian (natural minor), a lowered fourth, seventh, third, and sixth; Phrygian, a lowered fourth, seventh, third, sixth, and second; and Locrian, a lowered fourth, seventh, third, sixth, second, and fifth. Put another way, the augmented fourth of the Lydian mode has been reduced to a perfect fourth in Ionian, the major seventh in Ionian to a minor seventh in Mixolydian, etc.

Mode	White note	Intervals with respect to the tonic							
Mode	White note	unison	second	third	fourth	fifth	sixth	seventh	octave
Lydian	F	perfect	major	major	augmented	perfect	major	major	perfect
Ionian	C	perfect	major	major	perfect	perfect	major	major	perfect
Mixolydian	G	perfect	major	major	perfect	perfect	major	minor	perfect
Dorian	D	perfect	major	minor	perfect	perfect	major	minor	perfect
Aeolian	A	perfect	major	minor	perfect	perfect	minor	minor	perfect
Phrygian	E	perfect	minor	minor	perfect	perfect	minor	minor	perfect
Locrian	B	perfect	minor	minor	perfect	diminished	minor	minor	perfect

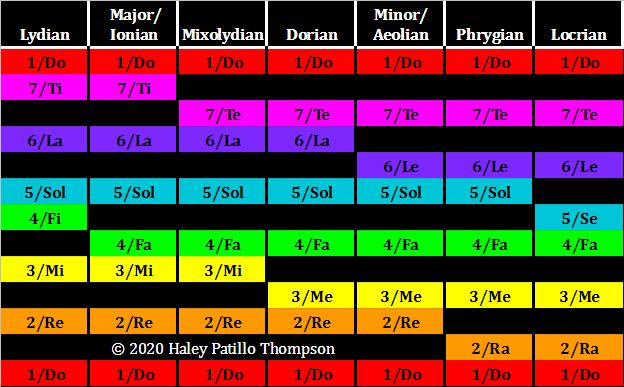
Modes Illustrated Using Movable Do Solfege (USA)

The first three modes are sometimes called major, the next three minor, and the last one diminished (Locrian), according to the quality of their tonic triads. The Locrian mode is traditionally considered theoretical rather than practical because the triad built on the first scale degree is diminished. Because diminished triads are not consonant they do not lend themselves to cadential endings and cannot be tonicized according to traditional practice.

- The Ionian mode corresponds to the major scale. Scales in the Lydian mode are major scales with an augmented fourth. The Mixolydian mode corresponds to the major scale with a minor seventh.
- The Aeolian mode is identical to the natural minor scale. The Dorian mode corresponds to the natural minor scale with a major sixth. The Phrygian mode corresponds to the natural minor scale with a minor second.
- The Locrian is neither a major nor a minor mode because, although its third scale degree is minor, the fifth degree is diminished instead of perfect. For this reason it is sometimes called a "diminished" scale, though in jazz theory this term is also applied to the octatonic scale. This interval is enharmonically equivalent to the augmented fourth found between scale degrees 1 and 4 in the Lydian mode and is also referred to as the tritone.

=== Usage ===
The usage and conception of modes or modality today is different from that in early music. As Jim Samson explains: "Clearly any comparison of medieval and modern modality would recognize that the latter takes place against a background of some three centuries of harmonic tonality, permitting, and in the 19th century requiring, a dialogue between modal and diatonic procedure." Indeed, when 19th-century composers revived the modes, they rendered them more strictly than Renaissance composers had, to make their qualities distinct from the prevailing major-minor system. Renaissance composers routinely sharped leading tones at cadences and lowered the fourth in the Lydian mode.

The Ionian, or Iastian, mode is another name for the major scale used in much Western music. The Aeolian forms the base of the most common Western minor scale; in modern practice the Aeolian mode is differentiated from the minor by using only the seven notes of the Aeolian mode. By contrast, minor mode compositions of the common practice period frequently raise the seventh scale degree by a semitone to strengthen the cadences, and in conjunction also raise the sixth scale degree by a semitone to avoid the awkward interval of an augmented second. This is particularly true of vocal music.

Traditional folk music provides countless examples of modal melodies. For example, Irish traditional music makes extensive usage not only of the major and minor (Aeolian) modes, but also the Mixolydian and Dorian modes. Within the context of Irish traditional music, the tunes are most commonly played in the keys of G-Major/A-Dorian/D-Mixolydian/E-Aeolian (minor) and D-Major/E-Dorian/A-Mixolydian/B-Aeolian (minor). Some Irish music is written in A-Major/F#-Aeolian (minor), with B-Dorian and E-Mixolydian tunes not being completely unheard of. Rarer still are Irish tunes in E-Major/F#-Dorian/B-Mixolydian.

In some regions of Ireland, such as the west-central coast area of counties Galway and Clare, "flat" keys are far more prevalent than in other areas. Instruments will be constructed or pitched accordingly to allow for modal playing in C-Major/D-Dorian/G-Mixolydian or F-Major/G-Dorian/C-Mixolydian/D-Aeolian (minor), with some rare exceptions in Eb-Major/C-minor being played regionally. Some tunes are even composed in Bb-Major, with modulating sections in F-Mixolydian. A-minor is less popularly played in the region, despite the localised prevalence of tunes in C-Major and related modes. Much Flamenco music is in the Phrygian mode, although frequently with the third and seventh degrees raised by a semitone.

Zoltán Kodály, Gustav Holst, and Manuel de Falla use modal elements as modifications of a diatonic background, while modality replaces diatonic tonality in the music of Claude Debussy and Béla Bartók.

== Other types ==
While the term "mode" is still most commonly understood to refer to Ionian, Dorian, Phrygian, Lydian, Mixolydian, Aeolian, or Locrian modes, in modern music theory the word is often applied to scales other than the diatonic. For scales built of a pattern of intervals that only repeats at the octave (like the diatonic set), the number of modes is equal to the number of notes in the scale.

=== Pentatonic scale ===
The pentatonic scale has five modes which can be analysed similarly to the diatonic modes, arranged in a sequence following the circle of fifths where each mode has one more raised interval relative to the tonic than the mode preceding it.

The intervals used in the pentatonic scale compared to the diatonic scale.

Pentatonic mode	Tonic note	Intervals with respect to the tonic					
Pentatonic mode	Tonic note	unison	second note	third note	fourth note	fifth note	octave
Major	C	P1	M2	M3	P5	M6	P8
Blues major	G	P1	M2	P4	P5	M6	P8
Suspended	D	P1	M2	P4	P5	m7	P8
Minor	A	P1	m3	P4	P5	m7	P8
Blues minor	E	P1	m3	P4	m6	m7	P8

=== Other heptatonic scales ===
Other heptatonic scales also have seven modes each. This is seen, for example, in melodic minor scale harmony, which is based on the seven rotations of the ascending melodic minor scale, yielding some interesting scales as shown below. The "chord" row lists tetrads that can be built from the pitches in the given mode (in jazz notation, the symbol Δ is for a major seventh).

Mode	I	II	III	IV	V	VI	VII
Name	Ascending melodic minor	Dorian ♭2 or Phrygian ♯6	Lydian augmented	Acoustic	Aeolian dominant or Mixolydian ♭6	Half-diminished	Altered
Notes	1 2 ♭3 4 5 6 7	1 ♭2 ♭3 4 5 6 ♭7	1 2 3 ♯4 ♯5 6 7	1 2 3 ♯4 5 6 ♭7	1 2 3 4 5 ♭6 ♭7	1 2 ♭3 4 ♭5 ♭6 ♭7	1 ♭2 ♭3 ♭4 ♭5 ♭6 ♭7
Chord	C–^{Δ}	D–^{7}	E♭^{Δ♯5}	F^{7♯11}	G^{7♭6}	A^{ø}	B^{7alt}

Mode	I	II	III	IV	V	VI	VII
Name	Harmonic minor	Locrian ♯6	Ionian ♯5	Ukrainian Dorian	Phrygian Dominant	Lydian ♯2	Altered Diminished
Notes	1 2 ♭3 4 5 ♭6 7	1 ♭2 ♭3 4 ♭5 6 ♭7	1 2 3 4 ♯5 6 7	1 2 ♭3 ♯4 5 6 ♭7	1 ♭2 3 4 5 ♭6 ♭7	1 ♯2 3 ♯4 5 6 7	1 ♭2 ♭3 ♭4 ♭5 ♭6 7
Chord	C–^{Δ}	D^{ø}	E♭^{Δ♯5}	F–^{7}	G^{7♭9}	A♭^{Δ} or A♭–^{Δ}	B^{o}^{7}

Mode	I	II	III	IV	V	VI	VII
Name	Harmonic major	Dorian ♭5 or Locrian ♯2 ♯6	Phrygian ♭4 or Altered Dominant ♯5	Lydian ♭3 , Melodic Minor ♯4 or Lydian Diminished	Mixolydian ♭2 or Phrygian Dominant ♮6	Lydian Augmented ♯2	Locrian 7
Notes	1 2 3 4 5 ♭6 7	1 2 ♭3 4 ♭5 6 ♭7	1 ♭2 ♭3 ♭4 5 ♭6 ♭7	1 2 ♭3 ♯4 5 6 7	1 ♭2 3 4 5 6 ♭7	1 ♯2 3 ♯4 ♯5 6 7	1 ♭2 ♭3 4 ♭5 ♭6 7
Chord	C^{Δ}	D^{ø}^{7}	E–^{7}or E^{7}	F–^{Δ}	G^{7}	A ♭+^{Δ}	B^{o}^{7}

Mode	I	II	III	IV	V	VI	VII
Name	Double harmonic	Lydian ♯2 ♯6	Phrygian 7 ♭4 (or Altered Diminished ♯5)	Hungarian minor or Lydian Diminished ♭6	Locrian ♮6 ♮3 or Mixolydian ♭5 ♭2	Ionian ♯5 ♯2	Locrian 3 7
Notes	1 ♭2 3 4 5 ♭6 7	1 ♯2 3 ♯4 5 ♯6 7	1 ♭2 ♭3 ♭4 5 ♭6 7	1 2 ♭3 ♯4 5 ♭6 7	1 ♭2 3 4 ♭5 6 ♭7	1 ♯2 3 4 ♯5 6 7	1 ♭2 3 4 ♭5 ♭6 7
Chord	C^{Δ}	D♭^{Δ♯11}	E–6 or E6	F–^{Δ}	G^{7♭5}	A♭^{Δ♯5}	B^{o}^{3}

=== Modes of limited transposition ===
The number of possible modes for any intervallic set is dictated by the pattern of intervals in the scale. Scales with a recurring interval pattern smaller than an octave have only as many modes as notes within that subdivision: e.g., the diminished scale, which is built of alternating whole and half steps, has only two distinct modes, since all odd-numbered modes are equivalent to the first (starting with a whole step) and all even-numbered modes are equivalent to the second (starting with a half step).

The chromatic and whole-tone scales, each containing only steps of uniform size, have only a single mode each, as any rotation of the sequence results in the same sequence. Another general definition excludes these equal-division scales, and defines modal scales as subsets of them: according to Karlheinz Stockhausen, "If we leave out certain steps of a[n equal-step] scale we get a modal construction". In "Messiaen's narrow sense, a mode is any scale made up from the 'chromatic total,' the twelve tones of the tempered system".

== Analogues in various musical traditions ==
- Maqam (Arabic/Turkish/Azerbaijani)
- Cantillation (Jewish music)
- Echos (Byzantine music)
- Dastgah (Persian traditional music)
- Raga (Indian classical music)
  - Thaat (North Indian or Hindustani music)
  - Pann (Ancient Tamil music) > Melakarta (South Indian or Carnatic music)
- Pathet (Javanese music for gamelan)
- Wǔyīn (Chinese traditional music)

== See also ==
- Gamut (music)
- Jewish prayer modes
- List of musical scales and modes
- Modal jazz
- Znamenny chant
