= Lydian augmented scale =

Third mode of the melodic minor scale

- Modes: I, II, III, IV, V, VI, VII

Component pitches
- C, D, E, F♯, G♯, A, B

Qualities
- Number of pitch classes: 7
- Forte number: 7-34
- Complement: 5-34

In music, the Lydian augmented scale (Lydian ♯5 scale) is the third mode of the ascending melodic minor scale.

Starting on C, the notes would be as follows:

Generically the whole and half steps are:

-  W -  W -  W -  W -  H -  W -  H -

The scale may be thought of as a major scale with an augmented fourth and fifth, or as the relative to the melodic minor ascending scale (C Lydian augmented and A melodic minor ascending share the same notes).

== See also ==
- Jazz scale
- Lydian chord
- Lydian mode
