= Mixolydian b6 scale =

Fifth mode of the melodic minor scale

Mixolydian ♭6 scale
- Modes: I, II, III, IV, V, VI, VII

Component pitches
- C, D, E, F, G, A♭, B♭

Qualities
- Number of pitch classes: 7
- Forte number: 7-34
- Complement: 5-34

The Mixolydian ♭6 scale, Aeolian dominant scale, descending melodic major scale, or Hindu scale is the fifth mode of the ascending melodic minor scale. It is named Aeolian dominant because its sound derives from having a dominant seventh chord on the tonic in the context of what is otherwise the Aeolian mode.

It corresponds to Raga Charukeshi in Indian Classical music.

This scale can also be obtained by raising the third degree of the natural minor scale.

== Chords and chord progressions ==
This scale has the following chords (in Roman numeral major-based notation):

I ii_{dim} iii_{dim} iv v bVI+ bVII

There are also some chords that are found in the scale, but are spelled incorrectly. They are as follows (spelled enharmonically):

I+ III+

Seventh chords in this scale include:

I^{7} ii_{m7b5} iii_{m7b5} iv^{maj7} v^{7} bVI+^{maj7} bVII^{7}

Common chord progressions in mixolydian ♭6 include:

I iv

I iv v bVII

== Melodic major ==
The name melodic major refers to the combined scale that proceeds as natural major ascending and as Aeolian dominant descending. It is named melodic major because it closes the augmented second in the harmonic major scale by either sharpening the sixth (ascending) or flattening the seventh (descending).

== See also ==
- Backdoor progression
- Harmonic major scale
- Jazz minor scale
