= Half diminished scale =

Sixth mode of the melodic minor scale

- Modes: I, II, III, IV, V, VI, VII

Component pitches
- C, D, E♭, F, G♭, A♭, B♭

Qualities
- Number of pitch classes: 7
- Forte number: 7-34
- Complement: 5-34

The half diminished scale is a seven-note musical scale. It is more commonly known as the Locrian ♮2 scale or the Aeolian ♭5 scale, names that avoid confusion with the diminished scale and the half-diminished seventh chord (minor seventh, diminished fifth). It is the sixth mode of the ascending melodic minor scale.

In the key of B♭, the half-diminished scale built on C is associated with Cm^{7♭5}, which functions as a ii^{ø}^{7} chord in minor (see chord-scale system).
