= Modus (medieval music) =

Medieval music term

In medieval music theory, the Latin term modus (meaning "a measure", "standard of measurement", "quantity", "size", "length", or, rendered in English, mode) can be used in a variety of distinct senses. The most commonly used meaning today relates to the organisation of pitch in scales. Other meanings refer to the notation of rhythms.

== Modal scales ==
In describing the tonality of early music, the term "mode" (or "tone") refers to any of eight sets of pitch intervals that may form a musical scale, representing the tonality of a piece and associated with characteristic melodic shapes (psalm tones) in Gregorian chant. Medieval modes (also called Gregorian mode or church modes) were numbered, either from 1 to 8, or from 1 to 4 in pairs (authentic/plagal), in which case they were usually named protus (first), deuterus (second), tertius (third), and tetrardus (fourth), but sometimes also named after the ancient Greek tonoi (with which, however, they are not identical).

Authentic modes		Plagal modes	
I.	Dorian	II.	Hypodorian
III.	Phrygian	IV.	Hypophrygian
V.	Lydian	VI.	Hypolydian
VII.	Mixolydian	VIII.	Hypomixolydian

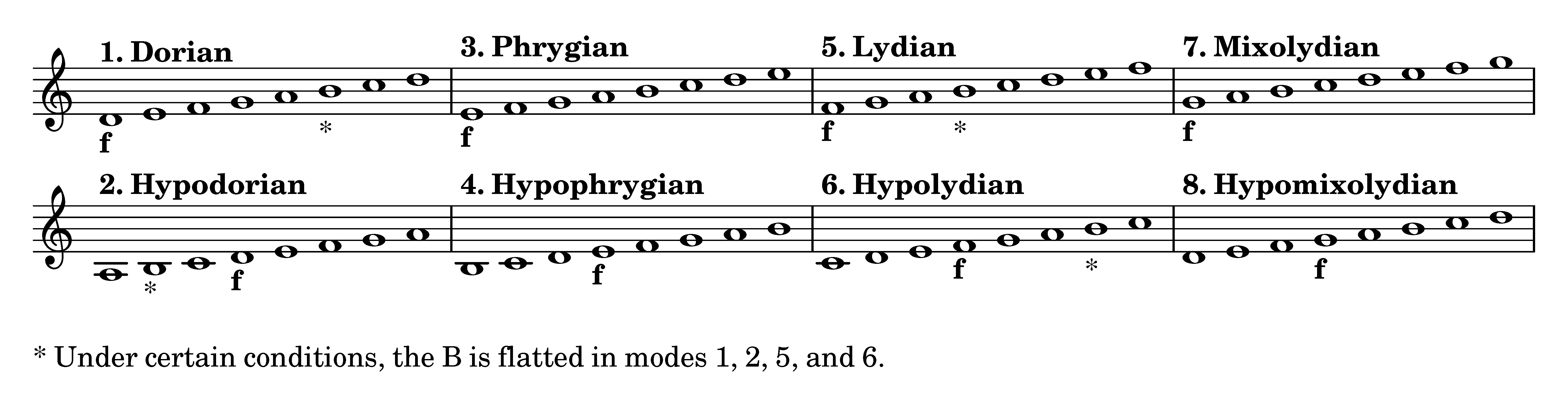
The eight musical modes. f indicates "final".

== Modus (modal notation) ==
In the medieval theory of rhythmic organisation, a mode was understood as a patterned sequence of long and short values. The expressions "rhythmic mode" and "modal rhythm", however, are modern names applied to the medieval concept. Just what relationship may have existed with a metric foot in ancient or medieval poetry or poetic theory is not entirely clear. Rhythmic modes were first used by the Notre-Dame school according to a classification numbered from 1 to 6. The patterns are all ternary, and vary in number (depending on the theorists' preferences) from four to nine. The six most often described, forming the nucleus of the system, are:

1. Long-short (trochee)
2. Short-long (iamb)
3. Long-short-short (dactyl)
4. Short-short-long (anapest)
5. Long-long (spondee)
6. Short-short (pyrrhic)

Rhythmic modes were the basis for the notation technique of modal notation, the first system in European music to notate musical rhythms and thereby make the notation of complex polyphonic music possible, which was devised around 1200 AD and later superseded by the more complex mensural notation. Modal notation indicated modes by grouping notes together in ligatures—a single written symbol representing two or more notes. A three-note ligature followed by a succession of duple ligatures indicated mode 1; the reverse—a succession of duple ligatures ending with a ternary on—indicated mode 2; a single note followed by a series of ternary ligatures mean mode 3 and the reverse mode 4; uniform ternary ligatures signified mode 5, and a four-note ligature followed by a chain of ternary ligatures meant indicated mode 6.

== Modus (mensural notation) ==
In the notation system of mensural notation (after c.1300), and in the century or so preceding the invention of that system, the term modus was used to describe a part of the overall metric organisation of a piece, comparable not to a modern time signature, but rather to what is sometimes called hypermeter—organization of measures into regular groups of twos or threes. It referred to the division of the note called a longa into either three (modus perfectus) or two (modus imperfectus) breves, for which reason it is called modus longarum. Similar divisions on subsequently lower levels were described by the terms tempus (corresponding to the modern concept of a measure or bar and referring to the division of breves into two or three semibreves) and prolatio (the division of semibreves into two or three minims). The modus longarum was applied primarily to pieces based on a cantus firmus tenor part in long note values. An even longer temporal unit was the modus maximarum, but it is of little practical importance outside of the 13th century.
