= Bebop scale =

Scale in jazz terminology

Bebop scale is a term referring to the practice of adding a note (typically a chromatic passing tone) to any common seven tone scale in order to make it an eight tone scale. Having eight notes enables the primary chord tones to continuously fall on the on-beats when the scale is played sequentially. This is unlike common seven note scales in which the chord tones do not all naturally fall on the on-beats due to an odd number of notes. These bebop scales are frequently used in jazz improvisation. Jazz educator David Baker nicknamed these scales the "bebop scales" because they were used often by jazz artists from the Bebop Era. These artists include Charlie Christian, Charlie Parker, Bud Powell, and Dizzy Gillespie, to name a few.

In general, bebop scales consist of traditional scales with an added passing tone, and when the scale is played from any chord tone and placed on any on-beat, then all other chord tones will also continuously fall on on-beats. Chord tones on on-beats are characteristic of all strong melodies throughout musical history. The remaining notes in the scale are non-chord tones and all fall on the off-beats.

As such, generally, any scale of seven notes may be modified by the addition of an additional note to accomplish the same effect allowing chord tones to naturally stay on the beat. The modifier "bebop" is reserved to indicate those modified scales most frequently used—and popularized—during the bebop era.

== Bebop dominant scale ==
The bebop dominant scale is derived from the Mixolydian mode and has a chromatic passing note added in between the flatted 7th (♭7) and the tonic. The chord tones root, 3rd, 5th, and ♭7th will naturally and continuously stay on the beat when played starting from a chord tone starting on an on-beat. Historically, in strong melody writing, chord tones are usually placed on the on-beats and nonchord tones are placed on the off-beats. The bebop scale helps enable this characteristic in melodic improvisation.

It has all the notes in both the major scale and the Mixolydian scale of the same root. This scale is often used over dominant seventh chords and over II-V chord progressions.

== Bebop major scale ==
The bebop major scale is derived from the Ionian mode (major scale) and has a chromatic passing note added (a ♯5) between the 5th and 6th degrees of the major scale. Adding the ♯5 note to the seven-note major scale allows the chord tones 1, 3, 5 and 6 (a major 6th chord) to land on on-beats when the scale is played sequentially.

Barry Harris called this scale the major sixth diminished scale and said that it is derived from a major sixth chord (1 3 5 6 of the scale), and a fully diminished chord from the second degree (2 4 b6 7 of the scale).

== Bebop melodic minor scale ==
The bebop melodic minor scale is derived from the ascending form of the melodic minor scale (jazz minor scale) and has a chromatic passing note between the 5th and 6th scale degrees.

It has all the notes of both the ascending form of the melodic minor scale and the harmonic minor scale of the same root. This scale is often used over minor sixth chords.

Barry Harris called this the minor sixth diminished scale and said that it is derived from a minor sixth chord (1 b3 5 6 of the scale), and a fully diminished chord from the second degree (2 4 b6 7 of the scale).

These scales are listed in David N. Baker's books on bebop. They are also included, with the exception of the Dorian bebop scale, in Roni Ben-Hur's book Talk Jazz: A Comprehensive Collection of Bebop Studies, which is derived from the work of Barry Harris. Ben-Hur further elaborates on the concept of placing additional chromatic passing tones between other notes in the scales.

== Bebop harmonic minor scale ==
The bebop harmonic minor scale (or bebop natural minor scale, as listed in Mark Levine's The Drop 2 Book) is derived from the harmonic minor scale and has a chromatic passing note added (an additional minor 7 (♭7)) between the minor 6th (♭6) and major 7th scale degrees.

It contains all of the notes of both the harmonic minor scale and the natural minor scale (Aeolian mode) of the same root. It can be used on all three chords of a minor ii–V–I progression. It is the sixth mode of the bebop major scale: for instance, the C bebop harmonic minor scale has the same pitches as the E♭ bebop major scale.

== Seventh flat 5 diminished scale ==
The seventh flat 5 diminished scale (which is identical to Messiaen's sixth mode of limited transposition) is derived from the whole tone scale, with an added fourth and a natural seventh degree. It is also a combination of a dominant seventh with a flat fifth on the first degree, and a fully diminished chord on the second degree.

== See also ==
- Chord-scale system
