= Hypophrygian mode =

Plagal Gregorian mode

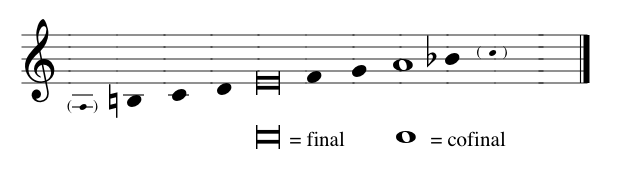
Hypophrygian mode on E.

The Hypophrygian (deuterus plagalis) mode, literally meaning "below Phrygian (plagal second)", is a musical mode or diatonic scale in medieval chant theory, the fourth mode of church music. This mode is the plagal counterpart of the authentic third mode, which was called Phrygian. In the Middle Ages and Renaissance this mode was described in two ways: the diatonic scale from B to B an octave above, divided at the mode final E (B–C–D–E + E–F–G–A–B); and as a mode with final E and ambitus from the A below to the C above. The note A above the final (the tenor of the corresponding fourth psalm tone) had an important melodic function. The melodic range of the ecclesiastical Hypophrygian mode therefore goes from the perfect fourth or fifth below the tonic to the perfect fifth or minor sixth above.

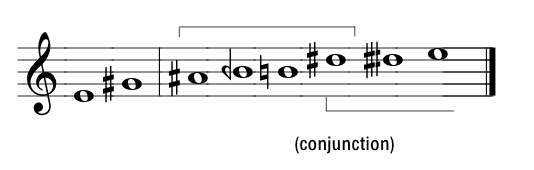
Ancient Greek Hypophrygian octave species on E (the barline marks the beginning of the enharmonic tetrachord, conjoined to a second tetrachord)

The name Hypophrygian originates in an octave species of ancient Greek music theory. According to Aristoxenus, this octave species was originally described around the year 400 BC by the Harmonicist school of Eratocles in terms of the enharmonic genus of the tetrachord: a series of rising intervals of two quarter tones followed by a ditone, together spanning a perfect fourth. The Dorian octave species begins with this tetrachord, which is followed by a whole tone and another tetrachord to complete the octave with a pattern of ¼, ¼, 2, 1, ¼, ¼, and 2 tones. This pattern is rotated downward one degree for the Hypolydian, and one more for the Hypophrygian, for an octave species of 2, 1, ¼, ¼, 2, ¼, and ¼ tones.

The name was appropriated by Ptolemy of Alexandria for one of his seven tonoi, or transposition keys. Ptolemy's system differed from the earlier Aristoxenian model, which had thirteen transpositional levels each a semitone from its neighbours. Ptolemy substituted a diatonic sequence of seven transpositions pitched either a whole tone or a semitone apart. The entire double-octave scale system was then transposed onto each of these relative pitch levels, requiring (in modern terms) a different key signature in each case, and therefore a different sequence of whole and half steps in the fixed central octave span. The Hypophrygian transposition was the second-lowest of these, a whole tone above the Hypodorian. A whole tone higher was the Hypolydian, followed a semitone higher still by the Dorian, then after another whole tone by the Phrygian, and so on. Four centuries later, the term was taken from Ptolemy in exactly the same sense by Boethius, who described these seven names as "toni, tropi, vel modi" (tones, tropes or modes) in the fourth book of his De institutione musica. In the late 9th century, in the Carolingian treatises Alia musica and in a commentary on it called the Nova expositio, this set of seven terms, supplemented by an eighth name, "Hypermixolydian", was given a new sense, designating a set of diatonic octave species, described as the tonal embodiments of the eight modes of Gregorian chant.

Missa Mi-mi (Missa quarti toni) by Johannes Ockeghem is a well-known example of a work written in the Hypophrygian mode.
