= Jazz minor scale =

Ascending form of the melodic minor scale

Ascending melodic minor scale
- Modes: I, II, III, IV, V, VI, VII

Component pitches
- C, D, E♭, F, G, A, B

Qualities
- Number of pitch classes: 7
- Forte number: 7-34
- Complement: 5-34

The jazz minor scale also known as the ascending melodic minor scale or the Ionian ♭3 scale is a derivative of the melodic minor scale, except only the ascending form of the scale is used. As the name implies, it is primarily used in jazz, although it may be found in other types of music as well. It may be derived from the major scale with a minor third, making it a synthetic scale, and features a dominant seventh chord on the fifth degree (V) like the harmonic minor scale. It can also be derived from the diatonic Dorian mode with a major instead of a minor seventh in it.

Thus, the jazz minor scale can be represented by the following notation:

1, 2, ♭3, 4, 5, 6, 7, (1)

The intervals between the notes of the jazz minor scale follow the sequence below:

whole, half, whole, whole, whole, whole, half

Or in short:

WHWWWWH

== Jazz theory ==
The scale may be considered to originate in the use of extensions beginning with the seventh in jazz and thus the necessity to, "chromatically raise the diatonic 7th to create a stable, tonic sound," rather than use a minor seventh chord, associated with ii, for tonic.

The jazz minor scale contains all of the altered notes of the dominant seventh chord whose root is a semitone below the scale's tonic: "In other words to find the correct jazz minor scale for any dominant 7th chord simply use the scale whose tonic note is a half step higher than the root of the chord." For example, the G^{7} chord and A♭ jazz minor scale: the A♭ scale contains the root, third, seventh, and the four most common alterations of G^{7}. This scale may be used to resolve to C in the progression G^{7}–C (over G^{7}, which need not be notated G^{7♭5♯5♭9♯9}).

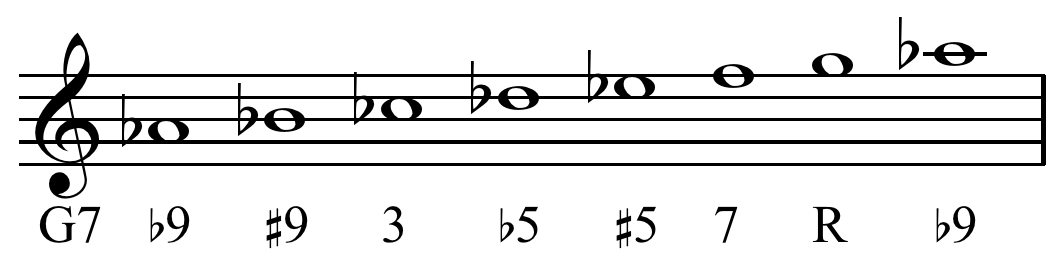
Jazz minor scale on A♭ with notes related to G^{7} chord alterations.

A♭ jazz minor scale over G^{7} resolving to C.

It is used over a minor major seventh chord. See: chord-scale system. The scale also easily allows diatonic chord progressions, for example a I−vi−ii−V progression:

|: C-^{∆7}	A-^{7(♭5)}	| D-^{7}	G^{7(♭13)}	:|

== Chord structure ==
=== Triad qualities ===
The triads built on each scale degree follow a distinct pattern. The roman numeral analysis is shown below.

- 1st: minor triad (I-)
- 2nd: minor triad (II-)
- 3rd: Augmented triad (♭III^{+})
- 4th: Major triad (IV)
- 5th: Major triad (V)
- 6th: diminished triad (VI^{o})
- 7th: diminished triad (VII^{o})

=== Seventh chord qualities ===
The seventh chords built on each scale degree follow a distinct pattern. The roman numeral analysis is shown below.

- 1st: minor-major seventh chord (I-^{∆7})
- 2nd: minor seventh chord (II^{−7})
- 3rd: Augmented major seventh chord (♭III^{∆7(+)})
- 4th: Dominant seventh chord (IV^{7})
- 5th: Dominant seventh chord (V^{7})
- 6th: half-diminished seventh chord (VI^{-7(♭5)})
- 7th: half-diminished seventh chord (VII^{-7(♭5)})

== Modes of jazz minor scale ==
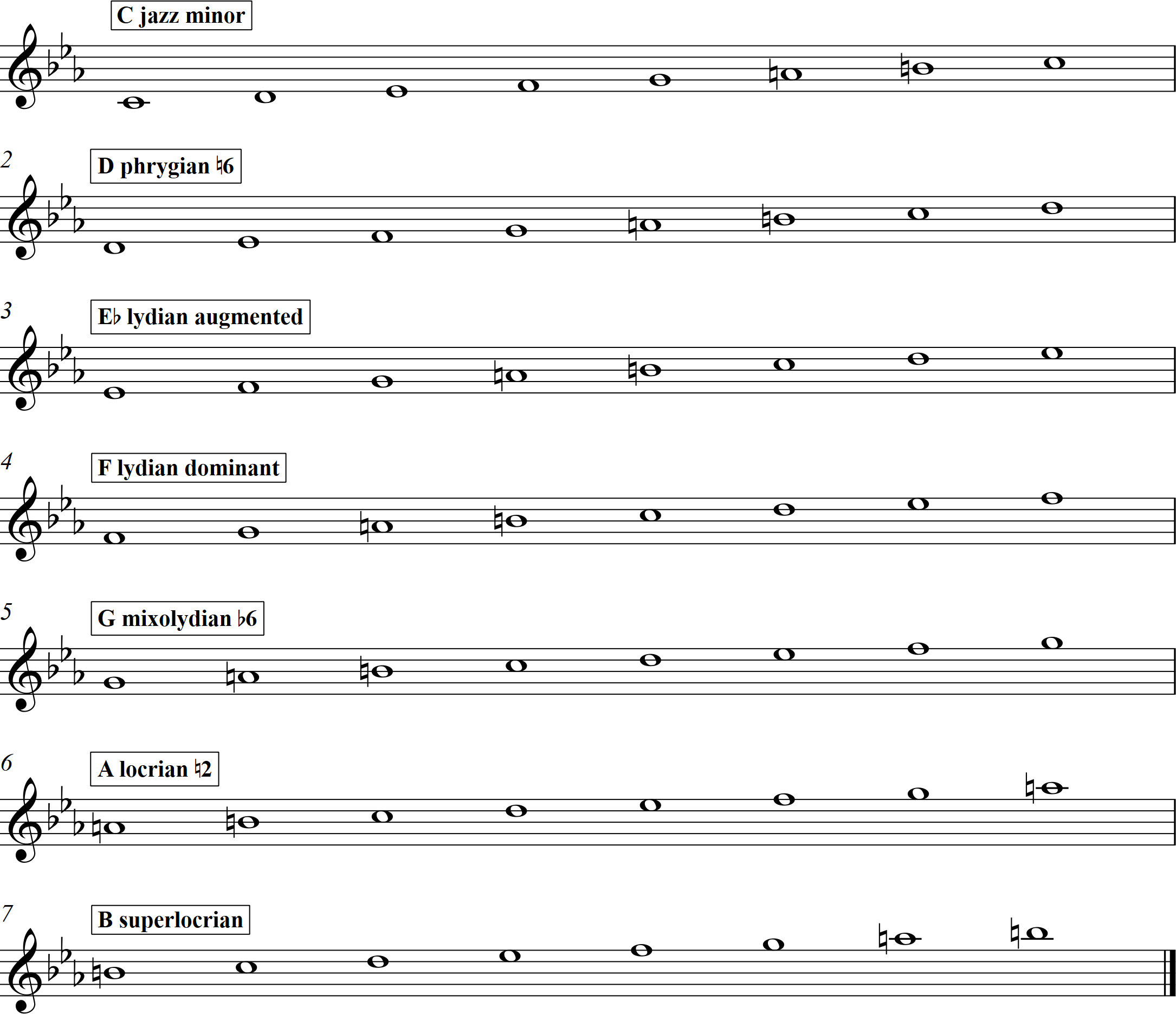
Modes of C jazz minor.

The jazz minor scale, like the diatonic scale, has seven modes. These modes are derived by treating a different note as the tonic.

Name(s)	Tonic relative to jazz minor scale	Interval sequence	Scale with only E♭	Scale on C
Jazz minor (or Ionian ♭3)	I	W–H–W–W–W–W–H	C–D–E♭–F–G–A–B	C–D–E♭–F–G–A–B
Dorian ♭2, Phrygian ♮6, Cappadocian, or Javanese (Indonesian Pelog)	II	H–W–W–W–W–H–W	D–E♭–F–G–A–B–C	C–D♭–E♭–F–G–A–B♭
Lydian augmented (Lydian ♯5)	♭III	W–W–W–W–H–W–H	E♭–F–G–A–B–C–D	C–D–E–F♯–G♯–A–B
Acoustic scale, Lydian dominant, Lydian flat 7, Mixolydian ♯4, or Overtone	IV	W–W–W–H–W–H–W	F–G–A–B–C–D–E♭	C–D–E–F♯–G–A–B♭
Aeolian dominant, Aeolian ♮3, Mixolydian ♭6, Descending melodic major, or Hindu	V	W–W–H–W–H–W–W	G–A–B–C–D–E♭–F	C–D–E–F–G–A♭–B♭
Half-diminished, Locrian ♮2, or Aeolian ♭5	VI	W–H–W–H–W–W–W	A–B–C–D–E♭–F–G	C–D–E♭–F–G♭–A♭–B♭
Altered scale, Super Locrian, or Altered dominant scale	VII	H–W–H–W–W–W–W	B–C–D–E♭–F–G–A	C–D♭–E♭–F♭–G♭–A♭–B♭

The names of these scales are variations of the names used for some of the modes of the diatonic major scale, for example the Phrygian ♮6, the second mode of the melodic minor, is named so because it is the same as the Phrygian mode of the major scale with a major sixth.

=== Relationship to diatonic modes ===
Each mode of the jazz minor scale can be considered to be related to two diatonic modes, with one note of the diatonic mode either sharped or flatted according to the table below, which is arranged in fifths.

Mode	Sharped diatonic	Flatted diatonic
Jazz minor	Dorian ♯7	Ionian ♭3
Dorian ♭2	Phrygian ♯6	Dorian ♭2
Lydian augmented	Lydian ♯5	Phrygian ♭1
Acoustic	Mixolydian ♯4	Lydian ♭7
Aeolian dominant	Aeolian ♯3	Mixolydian ♭6
Half-diminished	Locrian ♯2	Aeolian ♭5
Altered	Ionian ♯1	Locrian ♭4

=== Intervals from tonic ===
Each mode of the jazz minor scale features different intervals of notes from the tonic according to the table below, which is arranged in order of brightness.

Mode	Intervals with respect to the tonic							
Mode	unison	second	third	fourth	fifth	sixth	seventh	octave
Lydian augmented	perfect	major	major	augmented	augmented	major	major	perfect
Acoustic	perfect	major	major	augmented	perfect	major	minor	perfect
Jazz minor	perfect	major	minor	perfect	perfect	major	major	perfect
Aeolian dominant	perfect	major	major	perfect	perfect	minor	minor	perfect
Dorian ♭2	perfect	minor	minor	perfect	perfect	major	minor	perfect
Half-diminished	perfect	major	minor	perfect	diminished	minor	minor	perfect
Altered	perfect	minor	minor	diminished	diminished	minor	minor	perfect

== See also ==
- Modes of the melodic minor scale
- Harmonic minor scale
- Natural minor scale
- Major scale
