= Altered chord =

Musical terminology

An altered dominant chord in C major

An altered chord is a chord that replaces one or more notes from the diatonic scale with a neighboring pitch from the chromatic scale. By the broadest definition, any chord with a non-diatonic chord tone is an altered chord. The simplest example of altered chords is the use of borrowed chords, chords borrowed from the parallel key, and the most common is the use of secondary dominants. As Alfred Blatter explains, "An altered chord occurs when one of the standard, functional chords is given another quality by the modification of one or more components of the chord."

For example, altered notes may be used as leading tones to emphasize their diatonic neighbors. Contrast this with chord extensions:

Whereas chord extension generally involves adding notes that are logically implied, chord alteration involves changing some of the typical notes. This is usually done on dominant chords, and the four alterations that are commonly used are the ♭5, ♯5, ♭9 and ♯9. Using one (or more) of these notes in a resolving dominant chord greatly increases the bite in the chord and therefore the power of the resolution.

In jazz harmony, chromatic alteration is either the addition of notes not in the scale or expansion of a [chord] progression by adding extra non-diatonic chords. For example, "A C major scale with an added D♯ note, for instance, is a chromatically altered scale" while, "one bar of C^{maj7} moving to F^{maj7} in the next bar can be chromatically altered by adding the ii and V of F^{maj7} on the second two beats of bar one". Techniques include the ii–V–I turnaround, as well as movement by half-step or minor third.

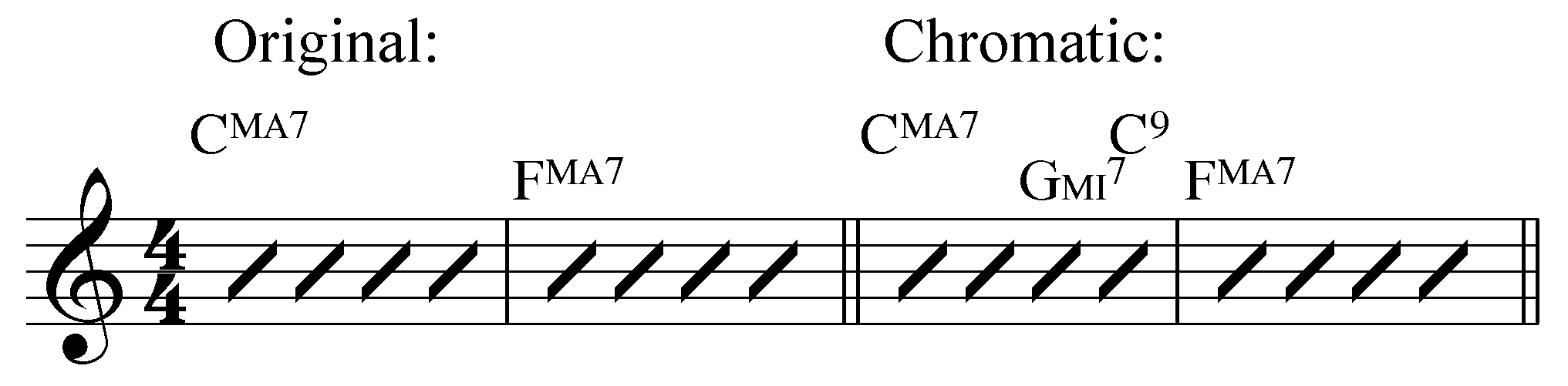

The five most common types of altered dominants are: V+, V^{7}^{♯5} (both with raised fifths), V^{♭5}, V^{7}^{♭5} (both with lowered fifths), and V^{ø}^{7} (with lowered fifth and third, the latter enharmonic to a raised ninth).

== Background ==
Chord progression with chords borrowed from the parallel minor

"Borrowing" of this type appears in music from the Renaissance music era and the Baroque music era (1600–1750)—such as with the use of the Picardy third, in which a piece in a minor key has a final or intermediate cadence in the tonic major chord. "Borrowing" is also common in 20th century popular music and rock music.

For example, in music in a major key, such as C major, composers and songwriters may use a B♭ major chord, that they "borrow" from the key of C minor (where it is the VII chord). Similarly, in music in a minor key, composers and songwriters often "borrow" chords from the tonic major. For example, pieces in C minor often use F major and G major (IV and V chords), which they "borrow" from C major.

More advanced types of altered chords were used by Romantic music era composers in the 19th century, such as Chopin, and by jazz composers and improvisers in the 20th and 21st century. For example, the chord progression on the left uses four unaltered chords, while the progression on the right uses an altered IV chord and is an alteration of the previous progression:

The A♭ in the altered chord serves as a leading tone to G, which is the root of the next chord.

The object of such foreign tones is: to enlarge and enrich the scale; to confirm the melodic tendency of certain tones...; to contradict the tendency of others...; to convert inactive tones into active [leading tones]...; and to affiliate the keys, by increasing the number of common tones.

The augmented fifth often appears in the soprano voice, as here in Franck's Symphonic Variations.

According to one definition, "when a chord is chromatically altered, and the thirds remain large [major] or small [minor], and is not used in modulation, it is an altered chord." According to another, "all chords...having a major third, i.e., either triads, sevenths, or ninths, with the fifth chromatically raised or chromatically lowered, are altered chords," while triads with a single altered note are considered, "changes of form [quality]," rather than alteration.

According to composer Percy Goetschius, "Altered...chords contain one or more tones written with accidentals (♯, ♭, or ♮) and therefore foreign to the scale in which they appear, but nevertheless, from their connections and their effect, obviously belonging to the principal key of their phrase." Richard Franko Goldman argues that, once one accepts, "the variability of the scale," the concept of altered chords becomes unnecessary: "In reality, there is nothing 'altered' about them; they are entirely natural elements of a single key system," and it is, "not necessary," to use the term as each 'altered chord' is, "simply one of the possibilities regularly existing and employed."

Dan Haerle argues that only fifths and ninths may be altered, as all other alterations may be interpreted as an unaltered chord tone or, enharmonically, as an altered fifth or ninth (for example, ♯1 = ♭9 and ♭4 = 3).

== Altered seventh chord ==
An altered dominant seventh chord arising from voice leading in the first movement of Chopin's Piano Sonata No. 2, Op. 35 Here a D dominant seventh chord changes to D dominant seventh with an augmented fifth – D7(#5) – which then resolves to a G major triad.

An altered seventh chord is a seventh chord with one, or all, of its factors raised or lowered by a semitone (altered), for example, the augmented seventh chord (7+ or 7+5) featuring a raised fifth (C E G♯ B♭). The factors most likely to be altered are the fifth, then the ninth, then the thirteenth. In classical music, the raised fifth is more common than the lowered fifth, which in a dominant chord adds Phrygian flavor through the introduction of ♭.

== Altered dominant chord ==
An altered dominant chord is, "a dominant triad of a 7th chord that contains a raised or lowered fifth and sometimes a lowered 3rd." According to Dan Haerle, "Generally, altered dominants can be divided into three main groups: altered 5th, altered 9th, and altered 5th and 9th." This definition allows three to five options, including the original:

- C^{7}: C–E–G–B♭
- C^{7♭5}: C–E–G♭–B♭
- C^{7♯5}: C–E–G♯–B♭
- (C^{ø}^{7}: C–E♭–G♭–B♭)
- (Cm^{7♯5}: C–E♭–G♯–B♭)

Alfred Music gives nine options for altered dominants, the last four of which contain two alterations each:

- C^{7}: C–E–G–B♭
- C^{7♭5}: C–E–G♭–B♭
- C^{7♯5}: C–E–G♯–B♭
- C^{7♭9}: C–E–G–B♭–D♭
- C^{7♯9}: C–E–G–B♭–D♯
- C^{7♭5♭9}: C–E–G♭–B♭–D♭
- C^{7♯5♯9}: C–E–G♯–B♭–D♯
- C^{7♭5♯9}: C–E–G♭–B♭–D♯
- C^{7♯5♭9}: C–E–G♯–B♭–D♭

Pianist Noah Baerman writes that "The point of having an altered note in a dominant chord is to build more tension (leading to a correspondingly more powerful resolution)."

== Alt chord ==
G^{7alt} chord with ♭5 and ♯5 as well as ♭9 and ♯9

In jazz, the term altered chord, notated generally as a root, followed by 7alt (e.g. G^{7alt}), refers to a dominant chord that fits entirely into the altered scale of the root. This means that the chord has the root, major third, minor seventh, and one or more altered tones, but does not have the natural fifth, ninth, eleventh, or thirteenth. An altered chord typically contains both an altered fifth and an altered ninth. To alter a tone is simply to raise or lower it by a semitone.

Altered chords may include both a flattened and sharpened form of the altered fifth or ninth, e.g. A^{7(♭5♭9♯9)}; however, it is more common to use only one such alteration per tone, e.g. B^{7(♯5♭9)} (which may also be spelled as B^{7(♭9♭13)}).

The raised fifteenth is only used when the ninth in a chord is natural. It functions as a minor ninth, creating a major seventh interval with the natural ninth, assuming that the chord is in root position. The notation of a raised fifteenth is a fairly modern addition to Western harmony, and they have been popularized by contemporary musicians like Jacob Collier. Natural fifteenths are never notated as alterations or extensions, as they are enharmonically equivalent to the root. For example, a chord that includes a raised fifteenth could look something like G^{maj13(♯11♯15)}, or if it were written as a polychord, A^{maj7}/G^{maj7}.

In practice, many fake books do not specify all the alterations; the chord is typically just labelled as G^{7alt}, and the alteration of ninths, elevenths, thirteenths, and fifteenths is left to the artistic discretion of the comping musician. The use of chords labeled G^{7alt} can create challenges in jazz ensembles where more than one chordal instrument are playing chords (e.g., a large band with an electric guitar, piano, vibes, and/or a Hammond organ), because the guitarist might interpret a G^{7alt} chord as containing a ♭9 and ♯11, whereas the organ player may interpret the same chord as containing a ♯9 and a ♭13, resulting in every tone from the altered scale at once, likely a far denser and more dissonant harmonic cluster than the composer intended. To deal with this issue, bands with more than one chordal instrument may work out the alt chord voicings beforehand or alternate playing of choruses.

The choice of inversion, or the omission of certain tones within the chord (e.g. omitting the root, common in jazz harmony and chord voicings), can lead to many different possible colorings, substitutions, and enharmonic equivalents. Altered chords are ambiguous harmonically, and may play a variety of roles, depending on such factors as voicing, modulation, and voice leading.

The altered scale on C

The altered chord's harmony is built on the altered scale (C, D♭, E♭, F♭, G♭, A♭, B♭, C), which includes all the alterations shown in the chord elements above:

- root
- ♭9 (= ♭2)
- ♯9 (= ♯2 or ♭3)
- major third (enharmonically, as ♭4)
- ♯11 (= ♯4 or ♭5)
- ♭13 (= ♯5)
- ♭7
Tritone substitution for C^{7} (F♯^{7}) and altered chord (C^{7(♯5♯9)}) as "nearly identical"

Because they do not have natural fifths, altered dominant (7alt) chords support tritone substitution (♭5 substitution). Thus, the 7alt chord on a given root can be substituted with the 13♯11 chord on the root a tritone away (e.g., G^{7alt} is the same as D♭^{13♯11}).

== See also ==
- Altered scale – Seventh mode of the melodic minor scale
- Augmented sixth chord – Chord that contains the interval of an augmented sixth
- Bar-line shift – Jazz technique
- Blue note – Note sung or played at a slightly different pitch than standard
- Blues scale – Musical scales
- Harmonic major scale – Musical scale
- Jazz minor scale – Ascending form of the melodic minor scale
- Modal interchange – Chord borrowed from the parallel key
- Neapolitan chord – Major chord in music theory
- Phrygian dominant scale – Fifth mode of the harmonic minor scale
