= Complement (music) =

Concept in music

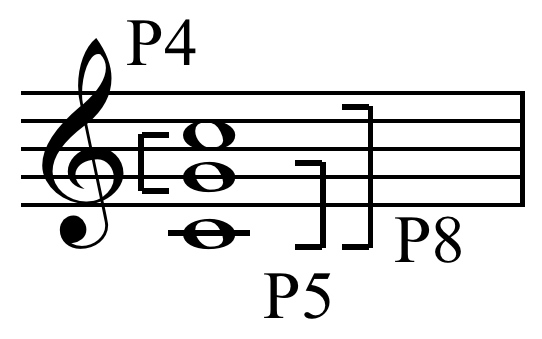
Traditional interval complementation: P4 + P5 = P8

In music theory, complement refers to either traditional interval complementation, or the aggregate complementation of twelve-tone and serialism.

In interval complementation a complement is the interval which, when added to the original interval, spans an octave in total. For example, a major 3rd is the complement of a minor 6th. The complement of any interval is also known as its inverse or inversion. The octave and the unison are each other's complements and that the tritone is its own complement (though the latter is "re-spelt" as either an augmented fourth or a diminished fifth, depending on the context).

In the aggregate complementation of twelve-tone music and serialism the complement of one set of notes from the chromatic scale contains all the other notes of the scale. For example, A-B-C-D-E-F-G is complemented by B♭-C♯-E♭-F♯-A♭.

Musical set theory broadens the definition of both senses somewhat.

== Interval complementation ==
=== Rule of nine ===
The rule of nine is a simple way to work out which intervals complement each other. Taking the names of the intervals as cardinal numbers (fourth etc. becomes four), we have for example 4 + 5 = 9. Hence the fourth and the fifth complement each other. Where we are using more generic names (such as semitone and tritone) this rule cannot be applied. However, octave and unison are not generic but specifically refer to notes with the same name, hence 8 + 1 = 9.

Perfect intervals complement (different) perfect intervals, major intervals complement minor intervals, augmented intervals complement diminished intervals, and double diminished intervals complement double augmented intervals.

=== Rule of twelve ===
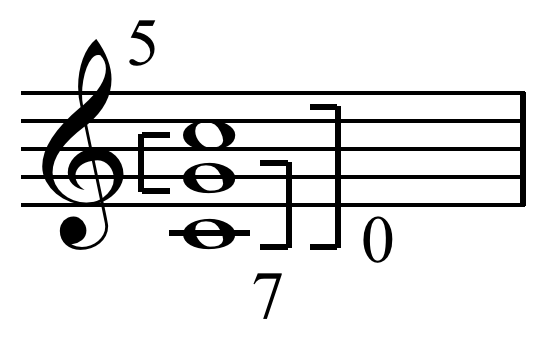
Integer interval complementation: 5 + 7 = 0 mod 12

Using integer notation and modulo 12 (in which the numbers "wrap around" at 12, 12 and its multiples therefore being defined as 0), any two intervals which add up to 0 (mod 12) are complements (mod 12). In this case the unison, 0, is its own complement, while for other intervals the complements are the same as above (for instance a perfect fifth, or 7, is the complement of the perfect fourth, or 5, 7 + 5 = 12 = 0 mod 12).

Thus the sum of complementation is 12 (= 0 mod 12).

=== Set theory ===
In musical set theory or atonal theory, complement is used in both the sense above (in which the perfect fourth is the complement of the perfect fifth, 5+7=12), and in the additive inverse sense of the same melodic interval in the opposite direction – e.g. a falling 5th is the complement of a rising 5th.

== Aggregate complementation ==
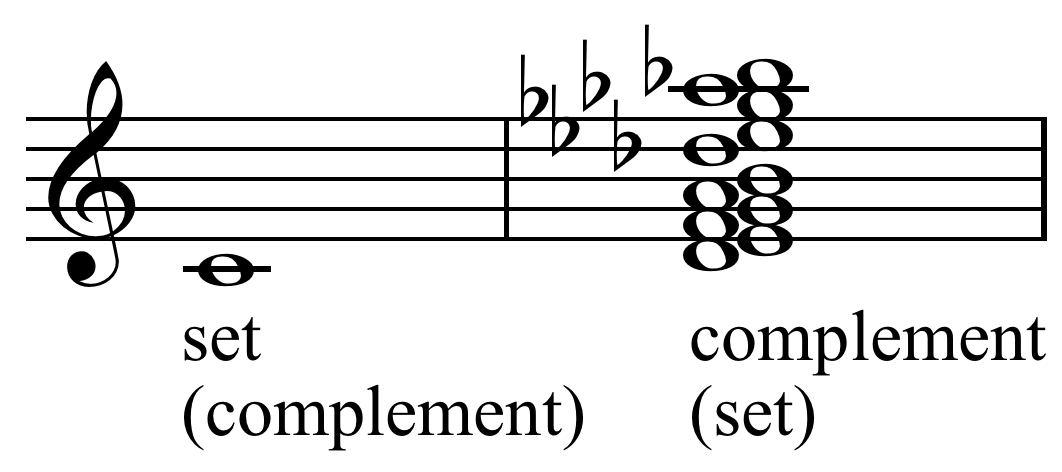
Literal pc complementation: the pitch or pitches not in the set on the left are contained in the set on the right and vice versa

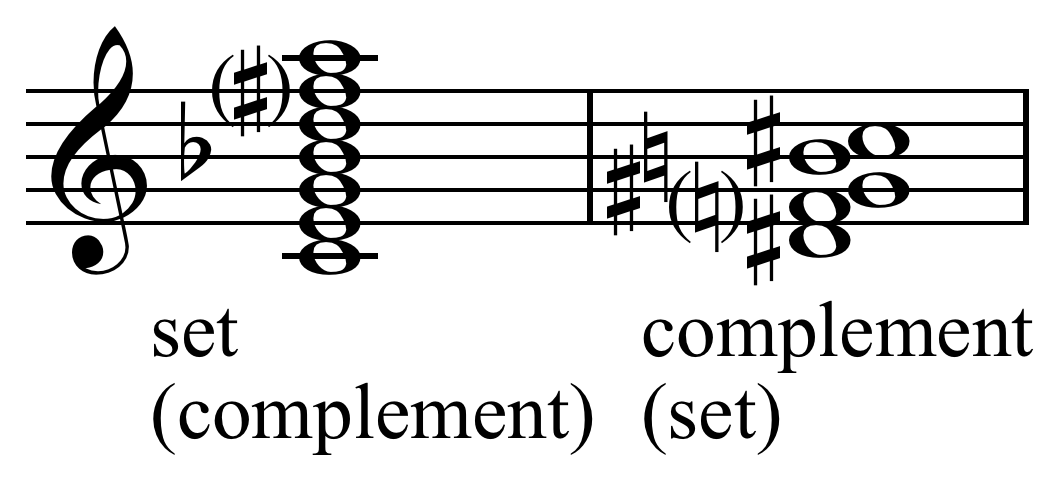
Side-slipping complementation: C^{7} chord/Lydian dominant scale (chord-scale system) and complement.

In twelve-tone music and serialism complementation (in full, literal pitch class complementation) is the separation of pitch-class collections into complementary sets, each containing pitch classes absent from the other or rather, "the relation by which the union of one set with another exhausts the aggregate". To provide, "a simple explanation...: the complement of a pitch-class set consists, in the literal sense, of all the notes remaining in the twelve-note chromatic that are not in that set."

In the twelve-tone technique this is often the separation of the total chromatic of twelve pitch classes into two hexachords of six pitch classes each. In rows with the property of combinatoriality, two twelve-note tone rows (or two permutations of one tone row) are used simultaneously, thereby creating, "two aggregates, between the first hexachords of each, and the second hexachords of each, respectively." In other words, the first and second hexachord of each series will always combine to include all twelve notes of the chromatic scale, known as an aggregate, as will the first two hexachords of the appropriately selected permutations and the second two hexachords.

Hexachordal complementation is the use of the potential for pairs of hexachords to each contain six different pitch classes and thereby complete an aggregate.

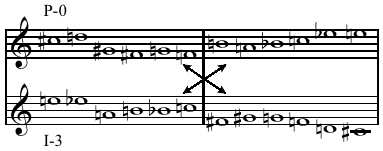
Combinatorial tone rows from Moses und Aron by Arnold Schoenberg pairing complementary hexachords from P-0/I-3

=== Sum of complementation ===
For example, given the transpositionally related sets:

  0  1  2  3  4  5  6  7  8  9 10 11
− 1  2  3  4  5  6  7  8  9 10 11  0
____________________________________
 11 11 11 11 11 11 11 11 11 11 11 11

The difference is always 11. The first set may be called P0 (see tone row), in which case the second set would be P1.

In contrast, "where transpositionally related sets show the same difference for every pair of corresponding pitch classes, inversionally related sets show the same sum." For example, given the inversionally related sets (P0 and I11):

  0  1  2  3  4  5  6  7  8  9 10 11
+11 10  9  8  7  6  5  4  3  2  1  0
____________________________________
 11 11 11 11 11 11 11 11 11 11 11 11

The sum is always 11. Thus for P0 and I11 the sum of complementation is 11.

=== Abstract complement ===
In set theory the traditional concept of complementation may be distinguished as literal pitch class complement, "where the relation obtains between specific pitch-class sets", while, due to the definition of equivalent sets, the concept may be broadened to include "not only the literal pc complement of that set but also any transposed or inverted-and-transposed form of the literal complement," which may be described as abstract complement, "where the relation obtains between set classes". This is because since P is equivalent to M̅, and M̅ is the complement of M, P is also the complement of M, "from a logical and musical point of view," even though not its literal pc complement. Originator Allen Forte describes this as, "significant extension of the complement relation," though George Perle describes this as, "an egregious understatement".

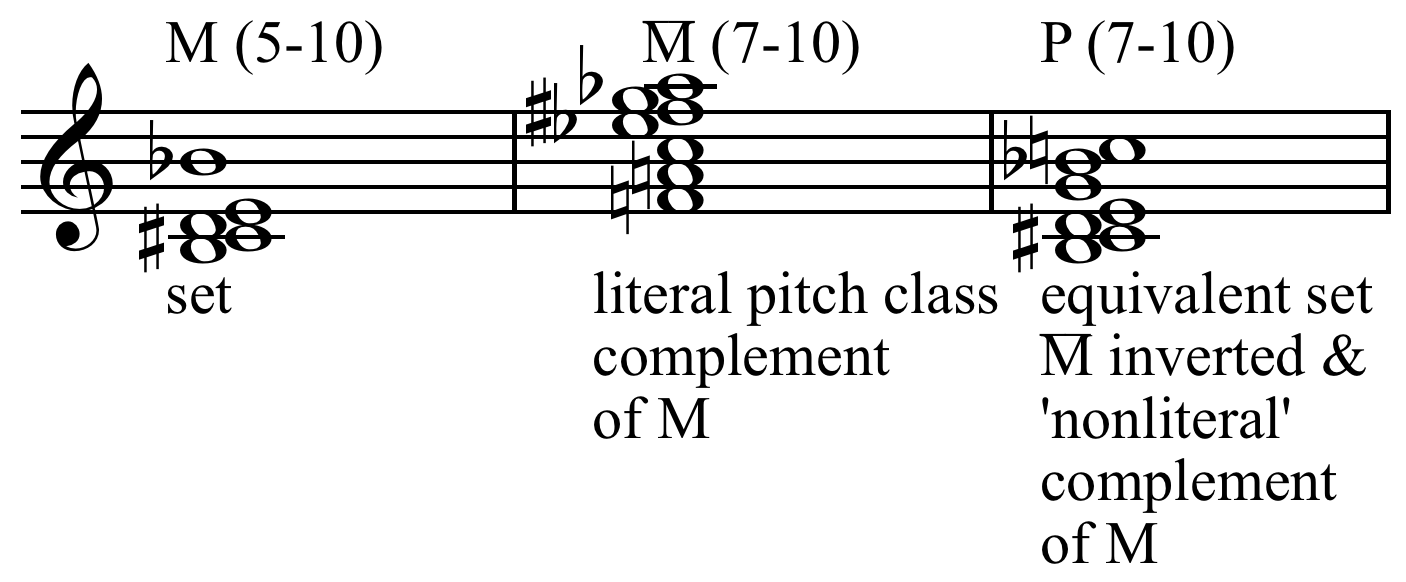
Example of abstract complementation drawn from Arnold Schoenberg's Fünf Klavierstücke.

As a further example take the chromatic sets 7-1 and 5-1. If the pitch-classes of 7-1 span C–F♯ and those of 5-1 span G–B then they are literal complements. However, if 5-1 spans C–E, C♯–F, or D–F♯, then it is an abstract complement of 7-1. As these examples make clear, once sets or pitch-class sets are labeled, "the complement relation is easily recognized by the identical ordinal number in pairs of sets of complementary cardinalities".

== See also ==
- Twelve-tone technique#Invariance
- Set theory (music)
