= Acoustic scale =

Fourth mode of the melodic minor scale

The acoustic scale is a sequence of seven notes that resembles a major scale with raised fourth and lowered seventh degrees. The sequence is also called the overtone, lydian dominant, lydian ♭7, or mixolydian ♯4 scale. The acoustic scale is the fourth mode of the ascending melodic minor scale.

== History ==
Ernő Lendvai coined the term in his analysis of Béla Bartók's music. He called it an acoustic scale because it derives from the overtone series. Lendvai found Bartók favored two organizational schemes, one ruled by asymmetric golden ratios and the other by symmetrical structures organized around the acoustic scale. Lendvai's speculatory work is often ignored in current scholarship. The scale is an example of heptatonia secunda.

The acoustic scale features prominently in the finale to Bartók's Concerto for Orchestra (1943). It appears sporadically in nineteenth-century music, notably in the works of Franz Liszt (Mephisto Walz No. 3) and Claude Debussy (L'isle joyeuse). The acoustic scale is also common in the music of Nordeste, the northeastern region of Brazil.

== Construction ==
The acoustic scale generates a chord that resembles C major with an added minor minor seventh (B♭) and raised fourth (F♯). The acoustic scale begins in the lydian mode and ends in the mixolydian. The major lower tetrachord contrasts with its minor upper tetrachord. This polymodality was a constant feature of Bartók's music, where major intervals were positioned closely alongside their minor counterparts.

The acoustic scale is familiar as the ascending melodic minor scale from the fourth degree. In jazz theory, the lydian dominant scale maps cleanly on to chords with a ♯11. It is an effective substitution for the mixolydian mode over the dominant chord.

== See also ==
- Chord-scale system
- Jazz scale
- Mystic chord
- Scale of harmonics
- Vachaspati (raga)
