= Minor scale =

Triad of scale patterns in music theory

The three classical minor scales, along with the lesser used Hungarian minor scale and Neapolitan minor scale, built on C.

A minor scale is a musical scale that contains a minor third, relative to its tonic note.

The term developed in western classical music, where the three most common minor scales are the natural minor scale, the melodic minor scale, and the harmonic minor scale.

In modern usage, several other scales are commonly referred to as minor, such as the Dorian and Phrygian modes, the minor blues scale, the minor pentatonic, and the Hungarian minor scale.

== Natural minor ==
C major and its relative minor scale.

The natural minor scale is the diatonic Aeolian mode. It can be played on the white keys of the piano as A–B–C–D–E–F–G. Because this A minor scale shares a key signature with the C major scale, the two are considered relatives. The major scale sits a third above its relative minor.

The major and natural minor scales have the same collection of intervals: two semitones and five whole tones. Beginning in the 17th century, they were the two dominant modes of tonal music.

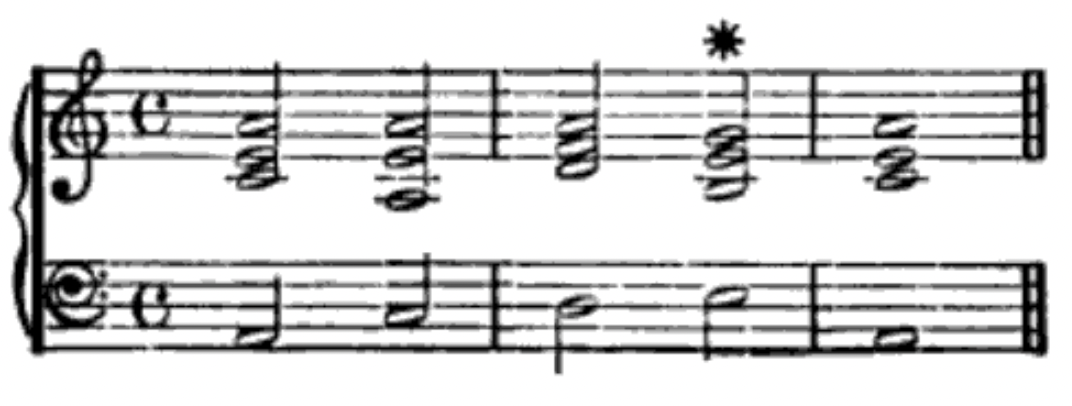
Chord progression in A minor demonstrating the minor V chord.

The resulting harmonies are quite different from the major scale. The tonic chord (A–C–E) is minor, as are the subdominant (D–F–A) and dominant chords (E–G–B). The absence of the leading tone made composing a satisfactory cadence difficult. This problem gave rise to the two common variations of the natural minor scale.

The term "natural minor" was not in common use until the twentieth century.

== Harmonic minor ==
A harmonic minor scale. F-G♯ is an augmented second.
A harmonic minor scale forms the theme in the opening of Robert Schumann's First Symphony (1841).

The first solution to the minor scale's missing leading tone was to simply restore it. This modification became known as the harmonic minor scale. The configuration creates an augmented second between the sixth and seventh scale degrees. Because of the melodic awkwardness of this interval, the harmonic minor scale prompted further refinement.

Harmonic minor scales are common in classical music. They can be found in works like Wolfgang Amadeus Mozart's Piano Sonata No. 16. Ludwig van Beethoven often relied on the upper tetrachord of the harmonic minor scale to create tonal ambiguity and maximize chromaticism in later works like the Grosse Fuge. Nikolai Rimsky-Korsakov considered the harmonic minor scale as part of the "basis of harmony". He also introduced the term "harmonic major scale" for a major scale with a lowered sixth.

Worcester Cathedral rings its "Harmonic Minor 10" on solemn occasions like Good Friday and Armistice Day. The church bells are half-muffled and play a pattern based on a descending minor scale.

Spirituals like "Go Down Moses" and "Soon I Will Be Done" employ the harmonic minor scale. In popular music, shredders like Yngwie Malmsteen made liberal use of harmonic minor scales as they expanded the vernacular of the guitar solo beyond the blues scale. Heavy metal guitarists often orient their use of the harmonic minor scale around the dominant, which introduces a Phrygian flavor to their melodies.

== Melodic minor ==
A melodic minor scale.
Antonio Vivaldi's theme from the opening of his second concerto in Antonio Vivaldi's L'estro armonico (1711) demonstrates the G melodic minor descending and ascending.

Given the awkwardness of the harmonic minor's augmented second, composers developed another version of the scale known as the melodic minor. When played upwards, both the sixth and seventh scale degrees appear as they do in the major scale. The only lowered scale degree is the third, which ameliorates voice leading. During a descent, the sixth and seventh scale degrees are lowered to their positions in the natural minor scale.

Consistently raising and lowering the sixth and seventh scale degrees requires copious accidentals. The primary minor key signature prevails, and the note alterations are so commonplace that they are viewed as diatonic.

Elton John uses a melodic minor scale in "Sorry Seems to Be the Hardest Word".

== Other minor scales ==
Many other scales with a minor third and a perfect fifth are often referred to as minor.

- The Dorian and Phrygian modes, often found in jazz and rock, are both considered minor scales.
- The ascending form of the melodic minor scale is also common in jazz, where it is referred to as the jazz minor scale, or simply the melodic minor.
- The Hungarian minor scale can be thought of as a harmonic minor scale with a raised 4th degree.
- The Neapolitan minor scale is a harmonic minor scale with a lowered second scale degree.
- Non heptatonic scales (those with less or more than 7 notes) can also be considered minor scales, such as the minor pentatonic and blues scale.

In other cases where scales contain a minor third, the definition of a minor scale can be subjective and is not universally agreed upon. The Locrian mode for example, due to its flattened fifth degree, is often referred to as a half-diminished scale instead of a minor scale. Other theorists do argue that it should indeed be classified as minor, or develop completely different classification schemes.

Even some scales that have both a minor third and a perfect fifth, such as the third Messiaen mode or the half-whole octatonic (symmetric diminished), are not conventionally referred to as minor scales; Messiaen himself argued against interpreting them as such.

== See also ==
- Diatonic functionality
- Jazz minor scale
- Jazz scale#Modes of the melodic minor scale
- Major scale

No.	Flats		Sharps	
No.	Major	minor	Major	minor
0	C	a	C	a
1	F	d	G	e
2	B♭	g	D	b
3	E♭	c	A	f♯
4	A♭	f	E	c♯
5	D♭	b♭	B	g♯
6	G♭	e♭	F♯	d♯
7	C♭	a♭	C♯	a♯
8	F♭	d♭	G♯	e♯
