= Japanese musical scales =

Scales used in Japanese traditional music

A variety of musical scales are used in traditional Japanese music. While the Chinese Shí-èr-lǜ has influenced Japanese music since the Heian period, in practice Japanese traditional music is often based on pentatonic (five tone) or heptatonic (seven tone) scales. In some instances, harmonic minor is used, while the melodic minor is virtually unused.

== Pentatonic scales ==
- Japanese mode: a pentatonic musical scale with the intervals of the scale a major second, minor third, perfect fifth and minor sixth.
- Akebono scale
- Hirajōshi scale
- In scale
- Insen scale
- Iwato scale
- Ritsu and ryo scales
- Yo scale
