= Yongquan Temple =

Yongquan Temple (Chinese: 涌泉寺; pinyin: Yongquan Si), may refer to:

- Yongquan Temple (Fuzhou), in Fuzhou, Fujian, China
- Yongquan Temple (Zhouzhi County), in Zhouzhi County, Shaanxi, China
