= Ritsu =

Ritsu may refer to:

- Vinaya, the Buddhist regulatory framework
- Risshū (Buddhism), a name of a Japanese school of Buddhism strictly following this framework
- the historical Japanese term for a criminal code as part of the Ritsuryō law system
- Ritsu scale, a type of musical scale; see Ritsu and ryo scales

== People with the given name ==
- Ritsu Doan (堂安 律; born 1998), Japanese footballer
- Ritsu Ito (伊藤 律), subject in a forged interview on The Asahi Shimbun
- Grayce Uyehara, born Grayce Ritsu Kaneda (1919–2014), Japanese-American activitst
- Ritsu Saito (斉藤 律), former guitarist in The Stalin

== Fictional characters ==
- Ritsu (律), a character in the manga series Assassination Classroom
- Ritsu (律), a character in the ONA and anime series Kemurikusa
- Ritsu (リツ), a character in the manga and anime series Fire Force
- Ritsu Enshū (円周 率), a character in the light novel series R-15
- Ritsu Hagio (萩尾 律), a character in the television drama series Half Blue Sky
- Ritsu Haraguchi (原口 律), a character in the manga series Chūgakusei Nikki
- Ritsu Hayakawa (早川 律), a character in the manga series Gin no Spoon
- Ritsu Imai (今井 律), a character in the anime series Mewkledreamy
- Ritsu Kageyama (影山 律), a character in the manga and anime series Mob Psycho 100
- Ritsu Kai (甲斐 リツ), a character in the novel Hana no Furu Gogo
- Ritsu Kamiji, a character in the visual novel series Parascientific Escape
- Ritsu Kasanoda (笠野田 律), a character in the manga and anime series Ouran High School Host Club
- Ritsu Kawai (河合 律), a character in the manga series The Kawai Complex Guide to Manors and Hostel Behavior
- Ritsu Koide (小出 律), a character in the visual novel The Fruit of Grisaia
- Ritsu Minami (南 律), a character in the manga series Loveless
- Ritsu Muses (リーツ・ミューセス), a character in the light novel series As a Reincarnated Aristocrat, I'll Use My Appraisal Skill to Rise in the World
- Ritsu Namine (波音リツ), a voicebank of UTAU program
- Ritsu Natsume (夏目 律), a character in the anime series Kado: The Right Answer
- Ritsu Onodera (小野寺 律), a character in the manga and anime series The World's Greatest First Love
- Ritsu Renjoji (蓮城寺 律), a character in the anime series Pretty Rhythm: Rainbow Live
- Ritsu Sakuma (朔間 凛月), a character in the game franchise Ensemble Stars!
- Ritsu Saotome (早乙女 律), a character in the anime series Star-Myu
- Ritsu Shikishima (式島 律), the protagonist in the anime series Caligula
- Ritsu Shitoizumi (潮泉 律都), a character in the light novel series Asura Cryin'
- Ritsu Shito (Chinese: 司徒律), a character in the manhua Spiritpact
- Ritsu Soma (草摩 利津), a character in the manga and anime series Fruits Basket
- Ritsu Tainaka (田井中 律), a character in the manga and anime series K-On!
