= Sakura Sakura =

Japanese folk song

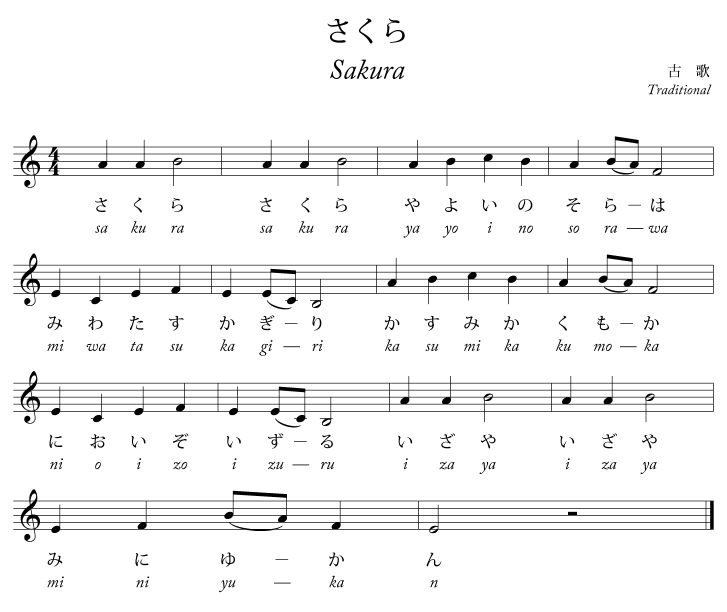
Score of "Sakura"

Sakura, Sakura
Sakura, Sakura sung by Hatsune Miku.

"Sakura, Sakura" (さくら さくら; "Cherry blossoms, cherry blossoms"), also known as "Sakura", is a traditional Japanese folk song depicting spring, the season of cherry blossoms. It is often sung in international settings as a song representative of Japan.

Contrary to popular belief, the song did not originate in ancient times; it was a popular, urban melody of the Edo period.

== Melody ==
The "Sakura Sakura" melody has been popular since the Meiji period, and the lyrics in their present form were attached then. The tune uses a pentatonic scale known as the in scale (miyako-bushi pentatonic scale) and is played in quadruple meter and has three parts (ABBAC) which stretch over 14 bars (2 + 4 + 4 + 2 + 2).

Expressed as diatonic notes in the major scale, the In scale is 3, 4, 6, 7, 8 (1), 10 (3); or the notes E F A B c e (Note: Lower-case letters are an octave higher; see Helmholtz notation.) (nominally A minor); or in solfège Mi Fa La Si Do Mi. The melodic scale can either be represented in older Western musical theory by the Phrygian minor or the Phrygian major mode, with the 3rd and 7th notes in the scale omitted.

Because the melody spans a modest range, it is ideally suited to instruments that have a limited pitch range, such as the Native American flute (similar to the shakuhachi). The melody arranged by Ongaku Torishirabe-gakari was included in Collection of Japanese Koto Music issued in 1888, for beginning koto students in the Tokyo Academy of Music.

Often, it is the first piece that koto beginners learn because they can play any phrase by picking closer strings without skipping to distant strings. There are several adjustment methods suitable for the in scale in Koto. Among them, hira-joshi is used for "Sakura".

== Lyrics ==
The original lyrics are listed as the second verse in the table below. In 1941, the Ministry of Education published a new verse in Uta no hon (うたのほん 教師用 下) which was listed first, with the original verse listed second. However, there are various theories about the original lyrics. According to one theory, it is said that "Sakura Sakura" is a parody of "Saita sakura". "Saita sakura" is thought to have been made as a Japanese koto song in during the Edo period. (Note: Lyrics: さいた桜 花見て戻る 吉野は桜 龍田は紅葉 唐崎の松 常盤常盤 深みどり)

Symbolism of Sakura (cherry blossom) is deeply rooted in the culture of Japan. This is because it symbolizes the transience of life and impermanence. For Buddhists, the five petals of Prunus yedoensis represent the five skandas that traditionally make up a human being; they arise, are beautiful for a brief time, and fall too soon. They are a primary example of the concept of mono no aware, the beauty of passing things. 'Falling flowers' is a metaphor to represent the warriors who died in battles and souls of the dead.

Standard

桜 桜
野山も里も
見渡す限り
霞か雲か
朝日に匂う
桜 桜
花ざかり

桜 桜
弥生の空は
見渡す限り
霞か雲か
匂いぞ 出ずる
いざや いざや
見に行かん

Hiragana

さくら さくら
のやま も さと も
みわたす かぎり
かすみ か くも か
あさひ に におう
さくら さくら
はな ざかり

さくら さくら
やよい の そら は
みわたす かぎり
かすみ か くも か
におい ぞ いずる
いざや いざや
みに ゆかん

Romaji

sakura sakura
noyama mo sato mo
mi-watasu kagiri
kasumi ka kumo ka
asahi ni niou
sakura sakura
hana zakari

sakura sakura
yayoi no sora wa
mi-watasu kagiri
kasumi ka kumo ka
nioi zo izuru
izaya izaya
mini yukan

Translation

Cherry blossoms, cherry blossoms,
In fields, mountains and villages
As far as the eye can see.
Is it mist, or clouds?
Fragrant in the rising sun.
Cherry blossoms, cherry blossoms,
Flowers in full bloom.

Cherry blossoms, cherry blossoms,
Across the spring sky,
As far as the eye can see.
Is it mist, or clouds?
Fragrant in the air.
Come now, come now,
Let's go and see them.

== Notes and references ==
=== Sources ===
- Tsuge Gen'ichi (2016). "Sakura". komuso.com. International Shakuhachi Society. Archived from the original on 15 April 2012.
- Ongaku Torishirabe-gakari (arr.) (1888). "桜 Sakura". In 東京音楽学校編 Tōkyō ongaku gakkō hen [Tokyo Academy of Music] (ed.). 「箏曲集」 Sōkyokushū [Collection of Koto Music]. Vol. 1. Distributed by Dai Nihon Tosho Kabushiki Kaisha. Tokyo, Japan: hakkōsha Tōkyō Ongaku Gakkō.
