= In scale =

Scale used in Japanese music

The in scale (also known as the Sakura pentatonic scale due to its use in the well-known folk song Sakura Sakura) is one of two pentatonic scales commonly used in Japanese folk music, excluding gagaku and Buddhist shōmyō. The in scale is used specifically in music for the koto and shamisen and is contrasted with the yo scale.

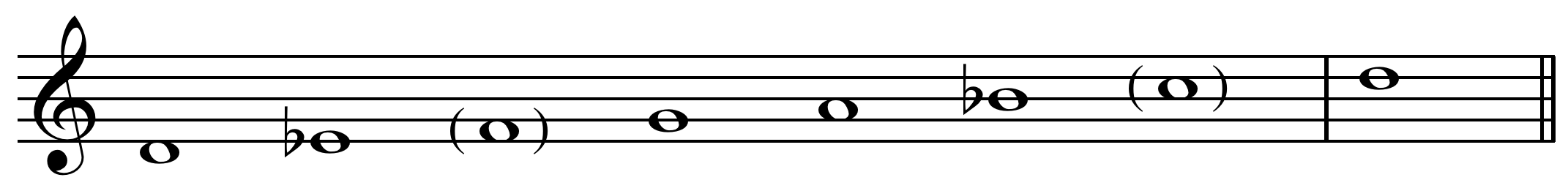
In scale on D with auxiliary notes (F) & (C). 1-b2-(b3)-4-5-b6-(b7).

More recent theory emphasizes that it is more useful in interpreting Japanese melody to view scales on the basis of "nuclear tones" located a fourth apart and containing notes between them, as in the miyako-bushi scale used in koto and shamisen music and whose pitches are equivalent to the in scale:

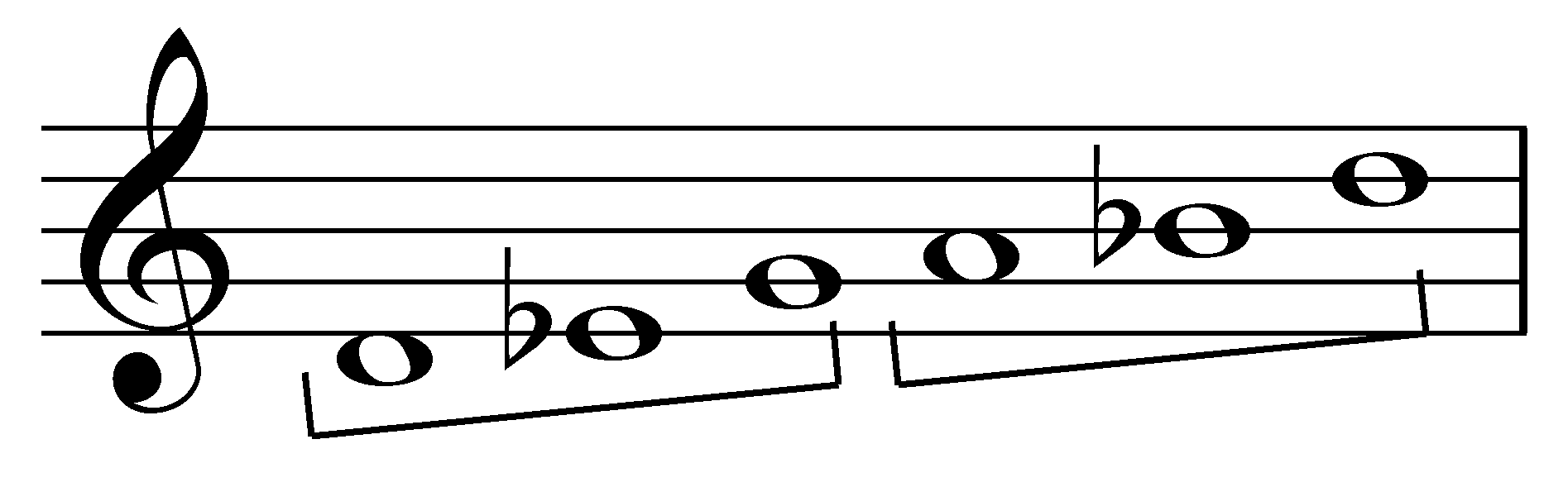
Miyako-bushi scale on D, equivalent to in scale on D, with brackets on fourths. 1-b2-4-5-b6.

== In scale in the other musical traditions ==
In Indian classical music, Gunkali (Hindustani), Raga Salanganata (Indian) and Karnataka Shuddha Saveri (Carnatic) are nearly identical to the pentatonic in scale, highlighting the shared past of their origins. Some rare examples of ancient genres of Andean music (e.g. k'antu) use a scale similar to the in scale combined with melody leading with a parallel fifths and fourths. For example, Machulas Kantu by Bolivia Manta folk group from the album Wiñayataqui.

== See also ==
- Hirajōshi scale
- Japanese mode
- Japanese musical scales
