= Yo scale =

Scale used in Japanese music

The yo scale is a pentatonic scale used in much Japanese music including gagaku and shōmyō. It is similar to the Western dorian mode, but does not contain all notes. The yo scale is used specifically in folk songs and early popular songs and is contrasted with the in scale. The in scale is described as more 'dark' while the yo scale is described as 'bright' sounding.

It is defined by successive ascending intervals of two, three, two, two, and three semitones. An example yo scale, expressed in western pitch names, is: D - E - G - A - B. This is illustrated below.

The Ryūkyū scale appears to be derived from the yo scale with pitches raised.

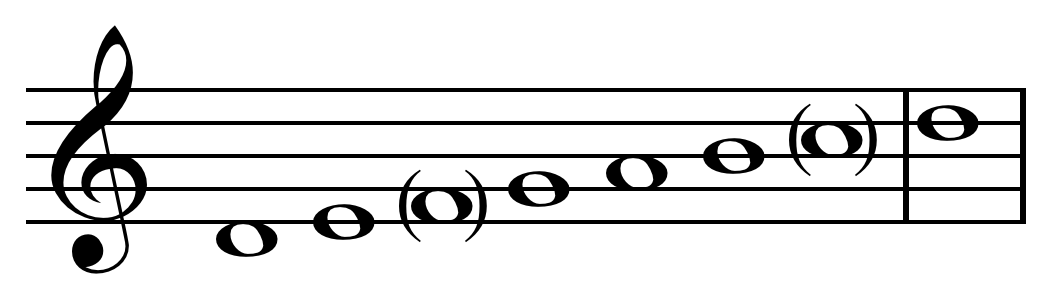
Yo scale on D with auxiliary notes (F) & (C)

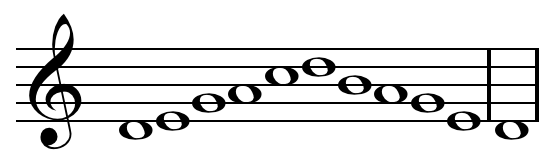
Yo scale on D, ascending and descending

More recent theory emphasizes that it is more useful in interpreting Japanese melody to view scales on the basis of "nuclear tones" located a fourth apart and containing notes between them, as in the min'yō scale used in folk music, and whose pitches are equivalent to the second mode of the yo scale:

In India's Carnatic music, this scale corresponds to Udayaravichandrika.

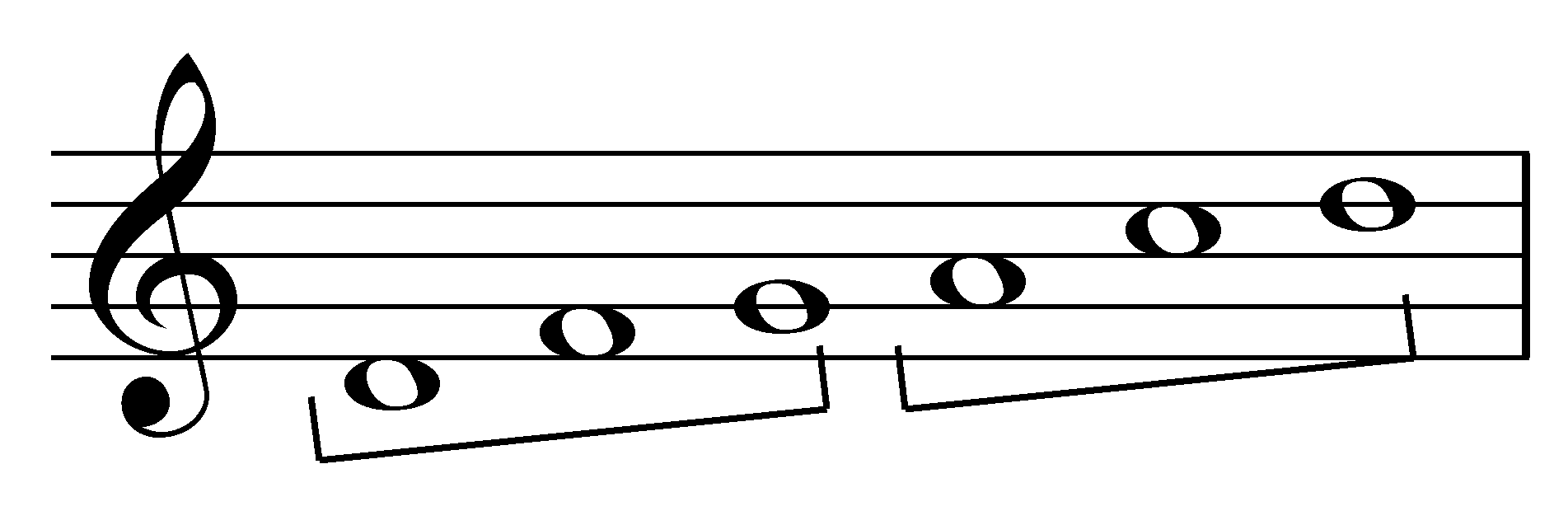
Min'yō scale on D, equivalent to yo scale on C, with brackets on fourths

== See also ==
- Japanese mode
- Japanese musical scales
- Hirajōshi scale
