= Yatsuhashi Kengyo =

Japanese musician and composer

Yatsuhashi Kengyō 八橋 検校 (Yatsuhashi Kengyō)
- Also known as: Father of Modern Koto
- Born: 1614
- Origin: Japan
- Died: 1685 (aged 70–71)
- Genre: Traditional Japanese music
- Occupations: Musician, composer
- Instruments: Koto, Shamisen
- Years active: 17th century

Yatsuhashi Kengyō (八橋 検校; 1614–1685) was a Japanese musician and composer. The name kengyō is an honorary title given to highly skilled blind musicians.

Yatsuhashi, who was born and died in Japan, was originally a player of the shamisen, but later learned the koto from a musician of the Japanese court. While the instrument was originally restricted to the court, Yatsuhashi is credited as the first musician to introduce and teach the koto to general audiences. He is thus known as the "Father of Modern Koto."

He changed the limited selection of six pieces to a brand new style of koto music which he called kumi uta. Yatsuhashi changed the Tsukushi goto tunings, which were based on tunings used in gagaku, and with this change a new style of koto was born. He adapted the Hirajoshi scale and the Insen scale for the koto, from the shamisen repertoire.

Yatsuhashi is also credited as the composer of the important koto solo piece Rokudan-no-shirabe (六段の調, Music of Six Steps), although he may not actually have composed it himself.
