= Parascientific Escape: Cruise in the Distant Seas =

2014 video game

- Developer: Intense
- Publishers: JP: Intense; NA: CIRCLE Entertainment
- Director: Tadashi Ehara
- Producer: Naoki Fukuda
- Designer: Benio
- Programmers: Hiromichi Koitabashi, Yoshiharu Umeta, Shunji Yamamoto
- Writer: Yuuto Kounaki
- Series: Parascientific Escape
- Platform: Nintendo 3DS
- Release: JP: July 9, 2014; WW: March 3, 2016
- Genres: Visual novel, adventure
- Mode: Single-player

Parascientific Escape: Cruise in the Distant Seas (Note: Known in Japan as Chou Kagaku Dasshutsu Story ~Zekkai no Gouka Kyakusen~ (超科学脱出ストーリー ～絶海の豪華客船～, lit. Super Science Escape Story ~Luxurious Passenger Ship of the Sea~)) is a visual novel adventure game developed by Intense. It was published for the Nintendo 3DS via the Nintendo eShop by Intense in Japan, and CIRCLE Entertainment in Western territories. It is the first entry in the Parascientific Escape series and was released on July 9, 2014 in Japan and March 3, 2016 in Western territories. A sequel, Parascientific Escape - Gear Detective, was released in 2015 in Japan and 2017 in Western territories.

== Gameplay ==
Similarly to Spike Chunsoft's Zero Escape, the game is a visual novel adventure game with incorporates escape the room segments. The player controls a young psychic called Hitomi Akeneno, as she attempts to find the truth behind mysterious circumstances occurring on a cruise ship. The game progresses between conversations with other characters presented as visual novel scenes, and point-and-click adventure gameplay in which the player has various options in order to try and find a way to progress past their current location.

The primary game-play involves clicking on the background to interact with various things in the environment. Touching most objects in the environment will give a list of actions you can perform, such as "look" to examine something or "enter" to progress past a door. The player can also interact with objects via the "examine" option in the menu, however, they have discovered the object by clicking first. The player may pick up items, which will be added to the "item" menu. They can then use these items during the course of various puzzles by selecting them from this menu, then interacting with whatever they want to use it on. The player can also select "talk" from the menu to converse with Hitomi's companions about various topics, as well as "travel", to fast travel to any currently available location. A "hint" option is also available, where the player can gain help on puzzles from their companions. The player can acquire several hints for the same puzzle, each subsequent hint spelling the solution out even more. At times the player comes across moments when they are required to use Hitomi's psychic abilities, by clicking on the "PSI" option when it comes available. These sections consist of first using clairvoyance to look behind a surface, before then using telekinesis to manipulate the objects behind it, in an attempt to bring an object out of a hole, open a lock, or move something to a particular place. However, both of these are limited to the available points. Looking behind limited parts of the surface uses up one "clairvoyance point", while every manipulation of an object uses up one "telekinesis point".

In between the escape segments the player is typically progressed via visual novel story scenes toward the next escape segment. However, they are sometimes also required to progress via gameplay. Some segments, involve the player's only option being to "talk" to a character, with the game progressing once all topics have been discussed.

== Characters and story ==
=== Characters ===
- Hitomi Akeneno: A 16 year old tomboy and the protagonist. Hitomi is seemingly the world's first "double psychic" who can use both clairvoyance and telekinesis and hides this status from the public. She was given up for adoption as a child and also lost her adoptive father who died while on duty as a rescue worker. His death has greatly affected her and made her reluctant to help others.
- Chisono Shio: Hitomi's childhood friend who has personally looked after her for the past ten years. Chisono is a telepathy psychic who is very book smart, and always likes to take the logical approach in a dire situation. She is willing to do anything to protect Hitomi.
- Merja Amabishi: The 14-year-old daughter of Evsej Amabishi, the CEO of the powerful conglomerate Amabishi Enterprises. She is a psychometry psychic. A very trusting girl with a large heart who is very cheerful on the surface, but who also feels deeply lonely due to her lifestyle as the CEO's daughter.
- Misaki Himekiri: A 22-year-old singer who was on board the ship as an entertainer. She agrees to aides them in their mission to save Merja and escape the sinking ship. Despite being beloved for her voice and beauty, Misaki is kind and modest. Unlike the others she is not a psychic.
- The Ghost of W: The name used by the mastermind who has strapped a bomb to Merja and is making her play a game to prevent its detonation.

=== Plot ===
Taking place in a world where PSI abilities are known to exist, but are barely understood, Hitomi Akeneno, is a psychic high school student with the power of clairvoyance and telekinesis. She is allegedly the worlds "first double psychic", as psychics are thought to all have only one ability, and she hides this status from all but her best friend, Chisono Shio. One day Hitomi is invited to the maiden voyage of a cruise ship via an anonymous invitation, from a sender who claims to know her father and sister. When she arrives at the suite designated in the letter, an explosion rocks the ship. She ends up stumbling upon Merja Amabishi in the suite, the daughter of Amabishi's CEO. Merja has a device strapped to her neck, and shows Hitomi a letter she received, stating that the device is a bomb that will explode in only a few hours, unless it can be activated via three hidden keycards. The letter is signed by the "Ghost of W", and warns Merja cannot seek help from more than three people, and cannot contact any officials. Hitomi and her best friend, Chisono; a psychic with telepathic abilities, take it upon themselves to utilize their abilities to save Merja, and discover the bomber identity, while also trying to escape the sinking ship.

The trio happen upon Misaki, a famous singer. Misaki agrees to aide the trio with their crisis. During the search for the keycards, Misaki tells Hitomi about her late boyfriend Wataru who died while searching as a doctor in a civil conflict in the country of Witsarock. After all three keycards are uncovered and are placed into the device to unlock Merja's bomb, Chisono notices that the writing on the cards spells out "M-I-S-A-K-I". Misaki confesses that she put the bomb on Merja's neck, and that she is an accomplice to the mastermind, although does not know their true identity. Misaki holds a deep grudge against Amabishi for their real in the Witsarock conflict which killed Wataru. She intended to kill Merja by detonating the bomb within just a few minutes, but she realized that she was simply being used by the mastermind when Merja's bomb failed to go off at the intended time. This caused her to realize the awful mistake she was making, and so joined the effort to save Merja of her own accord to recompense.

The group come head-to-head "The Ghost", who is dressed in the likeness of Amabishi's mascot, Mimimi. It is revealed that The Ghost is a female, that she is a double psychic with electrokinesis and teleportation abilities, which she utilised in the execution of her plans. The Ghost tells the group that she orchestrated the entire "game" for Hitomi's sake, as a "tutorial". She also tells Hitomi that she wasn't lying about knowing her sister. The group find a way to open a route to the ship's deck and make a desperate dash towards freedom. Hitomi strains herself to the limit on her telekinesis to keep the Ghost from shutting the final doors, allowing them all to get through. On the deck of the still sinking ship, the group take the moment to reflect on their experiences. Merja says that the experience has given her her first true friends, and Misaki declares her plan to confess to her crimes and atone for them. Finally, a rescue helicopter approaches in the distance, and everyone waves it down.

Hitomi and Chisono return to their regular life at school. However, the "miraculous escape" from the cruise ship becomes worldwide news. Consequently, Hitomi's status as a double psychic is now public and she has become a household name. The Ghost's motivations, her connection to Hitomi, and her true identity, also remain a mystery. Hitomi decides to join the psychic research organization ZENA so that she can help people with her powers, despite it possibly being what the Ghost wants her to do. Hearing Hitomi's plan, Chisono reluctantly joins too, to keep her safe.

== Reception ==
Reception

Review scores
Publication	Score
Nintendo Life	8/10
Digitally Downloaded	.5/5

Parascientific Escape: Cruise in the Distant Seas received mixed reviews upon its release. Ryan Craddock of Nintendo Life gave the game an 8 out of 10, stating that the game had an "enjoyable story", as well as praising the visuals and the "every enjoyable" gameplay system. However he felt as though the lengthy dialogue sections could feel "quite draining", especially given the lack of an option to save the game during these sections. Matt Sainsbury of Digitally Downloaded was far more negative, giving the game half a star out of five, calling it "the worst visual novel [he has] ever experienced". He heavily criticized the game's script, stating that "you could go to fanfic.net, grab any random piece, and plonk it in this game" and compared the story and its twists to "what you'd expect a ten year old writing her first mystery novel to come up with". Additionally, Sainsbury felt that the puzzles were "pointless busywork" and so simplistic that it was an "insult to anyone's intelligence to even call them a 'puzzle'". The only compliment he could find to give the game was that it had a loyal similarity to Zero Escape: Virtue's Last Reward and Danganronpa, which made him want to love the game despite his expectations.
