= Yongquan Temple (Fuzhou) =

Buddhist temple on Mount Gu in Fuzhou, China

- 涌泉寺
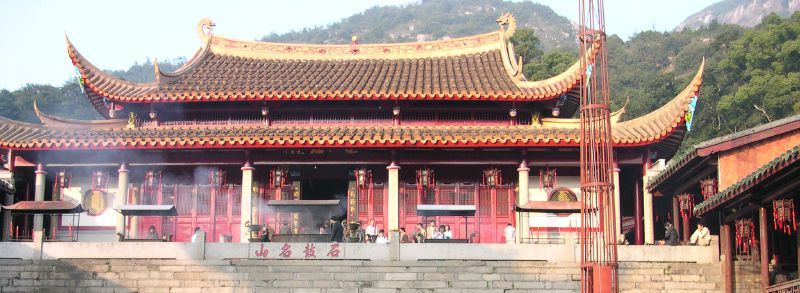
- The Mahavira Hall at Yongquan Temple

- Location within Fujian Location within China

Religion
- Affiliation: Chan Buddhism

Location
- Location: Jin'an District, Fuzhou, Fujian
- Country: China
- Interactive map of Yongquan Temple
- Coordinates: 26°3′27.90″N 119°23′27.02″E

Architecture
- Style: Chinese architecture
- Established: 783
- Completed: 1983 (reconstruction)

Yongquan Temple (Chinese: 涌泉寺; pinyin: Yǒngquán Sì) is a Buddhist temple located on Gushan Mountain or Mount Gu (Drum Mountain in English), in Jin'an District of Fuzhou, Fujian. It was first built in 783 during the Tang dynasty (618–907), and went through many changes and repairs through the following dynasties. Most of the present structures in the temple were repaired or built in the Jiajing period (1522–1566) during the Ming dynasty (1368–1644).

== History ==
=== Tang dynasty ===
Yongquan Temple was first built in 783, in the reign of Emperor Dezong of the Tang dynasty (618–907), it initially called "Huayan Temple" (华严寺).

Since Emperor Wuzong (814–846) believed in Taoism, he presided over the destruction of tens of thousands of temples, confiscate temple lands and force monks to return to secular life. Without exception, Yongquan Temple was completely destroyed in this Great Anti-Buddhist Persecution.

=== Five Dynasties and Ten Kingdoms ===
In 908, under the Five Dynasties and Ten Kingdoms (907–960), Wang Shenzhi (王审知), the king of Fujian, asked the exceptional monk Shenyan (神晏) to supervise the reconstruction of Yongquan Temple. The name was changed into "Yongquan Chan Temple" (涌泉禅院) because a spring flowed through its Four Heavenly Kings Hall.

=== Song dynasty ===
In the Song dynasty, Emperor Zhenzong (998–1022) inscribed a plaque of Chinese characters "Yongquan Chan Temple" to the temple.

=== Ming dynasty ===
In 1407, in the Yongle era (1402–1424) of the Ming dynasty (1368–1644), the temple was renamed "Yongquan Temple" (涌泉寺).Yongquan Temple went through two fires and several rebuilds, including the catastrophic fire in 1408 and the disastrous fire in 1542. The Mahavira Hall was restored in 1619 by Cao Xuequan (曹学佺) and master Daodong Zhidi (道东智谛). The Dharma Hall was elected in 1629 by Lin Hongyan (林宏衍) and monk Hongxiao (宏晓). The Bell tower and Drum tower were added to the temple by Lin Hongyan in 1633. The Four Heavenly Kings Hall was rebuilt by Cao Xuequan in the following year.

=== Qing dynasty ===
Yongquan Temple was refurbished and redecorated by Yuanxian (元贤) in the early Qing dynasty (1644–1911), In 1699, in the 38th year of Kangxi period (1662–1722), Kangxi Emperor inscribed and honored the name "Yongquan Temple".

=== People's Republic of China ===
After the founding of the Communist State, the Fujian Provincial Government afforded great protection to the temple.

Yongquan Temple has been classified as a National Key Buddhist Temple in Han Chinese Area by the State Council of China in 1983.

== Architecture ==
Yongquan Temple is built along the up and down of maintains. The over 25 rooms and halls still maintain the architectural style of the Jiajing period (1522–1566) in the Ming dynasty (1368–1644). The complex include the following halls: Free Life Pond, Mahavira Hall, Hall of Four Heavenly Kings, Bell tower, Drum tower, Hall of Guru, Dharma Hall, Buddhist Texts Library, Meditation Hall, Reception Hall, Dining Room, etc.

=== Mahavira Hall ===
The Mahavira Hall was first built in 908 and rebuilt in the Song dynasty (960–1279). It was burned down in the Ming dynasty (1368–1644) and restored in 1882 during the Guangxu period (1875–1908) of the Qing dynasty (1644–1911). States of Three Life Buddha are enshrined in the middle of the hall with statues of Eighteen Arhats stand on both sides. At the back of the hall enshrining the Three Sages of the West (西方三圣), namely Guanyin, Amitabha and Mahasthamaprapta.

=== Pottery Pagodas of Thousand Buddha ===
A pair of Pottery Pagoda of Thousand Buddha are placed in the temple. They were made in 1082 in the Song dynasty (960–1279). The 6.83-metre (22.4 ft) pagodas were octagonal with nine stories. It is composed of a pagoda base and a dense-eave body. The base were engraved patterns of various flying phoenixes, lotuses, Hercules, monsters, etc. Over 1,078 exquisite niches with small statues of Buddha are carved on the body of the pagoda.

== National Treasures ==
=== Bronze bell ===
A bronze bell was cast in the 18th century during the Qing dynasty (1644–1911) weighting 2,000 kilograms (4,400 lb). Outside the bell carved 6,372 words of Diamond Sutra.

=== Avatamsaka Sutra ===
Over ten sets of Avatamsaka Sutra which was printed in the Ming dynasty (1368–1644) are preserved in the temple.
