= Parascientific Escape =

- Genres: Visual novel, adventure
- Developer: Intense
- Publishers: JP: Intense; NA: CIRCLE Entertainment
- Writer: Yuuto Kounaki
- Platform: Nintendo 3DS
- First release: Cruise in the Distant Seas; July 9, 2014
- Latest release: Crossing at the Farthest Horizon; August 31, 2017

Parascientific Escape (Note: Known in Japan as Chou Kagaku Dasshutsu (超科学脱出, lit. Super Science Escape Story)) is a series of visual novel adventure games developed by Intense and released for the Nintendo 3DS via the Nintendo eShop. It was published by Intense in Japan and CIRCLE Entertainment in North America and Europe. The trilogy follows the interconnecting narrative of the characters Hitomi Akeneno and Kyosuke Ayana, who both have psychic abilities.

== Titles ==
- Parascientific Escape: Cruise in the Distant Seas is the first game in the series, developed by Intense. It was released for the Nintendo 3DS on July 9, 2014, in Japan, and on March 3, 2016, in North America and Europe.
- Parascientific Escape - Gear Detective is the second entry in the series. It was released on the Nintendo 3DS on December 2, 2015, in Japan, February 9, 2017, in North America, and March 2, 2017, in Europe.
- Parascientific Escape - Crossing at the Farthest Horizon is the third game in the series. It was released for the Nintendo 3DS on February 22, 2017, in Japan, July 27, 2017, in North America, and August 31, 2017, in Europe.

== Plot and setting ==
=== Recurring elements and characters ===
The series takes place in an alternative world where people born with paranormal abilities are known as psychics, and are studied regularly in the field of parascience. The first game follows Hitomi Akeneno, a high school student who hides her status as the world's first double psychic, being able to use both clairvoyance and telekinesis. The protagonist of the second game is the private detective Kyosuke Ayana, who was not born with psychic powers but can artificially use chronokenisis via his prosthetic arm and eye. The third game features both Hitomi and Kyosuke as protagonists, (Note: It is erroneously advertised that the player is given the choice between playing Hitomi and Kyosuke's storylines. The actual game consists of a single narrative, in which the shift to another character's point of view is signified by an introduction. This introduction announces the next segment as "episode [character name]", and includes characters outside of Hitomi and Kyosuke.) as well as two new protagonists, Tsukiko Nagise and Ritsu Kamiji, though Kyosuke is the only character playable during the "search" and "map" segments. The player can only control the other three protagonists through selecting dialogue options.

Hitomi is accompanied through the first game by her friend, Chisono Shio, who is a telepathy psychic. Other characters include Merja Amabishi, the daughter of Amabishi's CEO and Misaki Himekiri, a famous singer. Kyosuke is aided in the second game by Mari Sasamine, his assistant who wants him to be her husband, along with Yukiya Ousaka, Kyosuke's close friend and a secretary of IXG. In the third game, key returning characters include Ritsu Kamiji, the "strongest physic" who is also Hitomi's sister, and Tsukiko Nagise, the culprit of the serial murder in Camellia Hills who is on probation via a special plea bargain.

A major plot element in the series is the Amabishi conglomerate, and its co-operative relationships with ZENA, a psychic research organization who receives their funding from Amabishi, and IXG, who is Amabishi's main rival in weapon manufacturing. The fictional former Soviet Union country of Witsarock and its heated relations with its Armagrad region also plays a major role. Armagrad recently gained its independence from Witsarock following a civil war, although they are still trying to be recognized as an official sovereign state. Another overarching theme is the relationship between psychics and ordinary humans, the former of which is a vast minority, thus regularly face prejudice, as well as the risk of having to undergo experimentation.

=== Cruise in the Distant Seas ===
Hitomi Akeneno, a psychic high school student with the power of clairvoyance and telekenesis, is invited to the maiden voyage of a cruise ship by an anonymous party who claims to know her father and sister. When she arrives at the suite designated in the letter, an explosion rocks the ship. She stumbles upon Merja Amabishi, the daughter of Amabishi's CEO, in the suite. Merja shows Hitomi a letter she received, stating that a device strapped to her neck is a bomb that will explode in a few hours, unless it is activated via three hidden keycards. The letter is signed by the "Ghost of W", and warns Merja cannot seek help from more than three people, and cannot contact any officials. Hitomi and her best friend, Chisono Shio, a psychic with telepathic abilities, take it upon themselves to utilize their abilities to save Merja, discover the bomber identity, and escape the sinking ship.

The trio happen upon Misaki, a famous singer. Misaki agrees to aide the trio. During the search for the keycards, Misaki tells Hitomi her boyfriend Wataru died while searching as a doctor in a civil conflict in the country of Witsarock. After all three keycards are uncovered and placed into the device to unlock Merja's bomb, Chisono notices that the writing on the cards spells out "M-I-S-A-K-I". Misaki confesses that she put the bomb on Merja's neck, and that she is an accomplice to the Ghost of W. Misaki holds a deep grudge against Amabishi for the Witsarock conflict which killed Wataru. She intended to kill Merja by detonating the bomb within just a few minutes, but she realized that she was being used by the Ghost of W when Merja's bomb failed to go off at the intended time. This caused a change of heart, and she joined the effort to save Merja of her own accord to recompense.

The group meet "The Ghost", who is dressed in the likeness of Amabishi's mascot, Mimimi. The Ghost is a double psychic with electrokinesis and teleportation abilities, which she utilised in the execution of her plans. The Ghost says she orchestrated the entire "game" for Hitomi's sake, as a "tutorial". She also tells Hitomi that she wasn't lying about knowing her sister. The group open a route to the ship's deck and dash towards freedom. Hitomi strains herself to the limit of her telekinesis to keep the Ghost from shutting the final doors, allowing them all to get through. On the deck of the sinking ship the group wave down a helicopter.

The events of the "miraculous escape" become worldwide news. Consequently, Hitomi's status as a double psychic is now public. Hitomi and Chisono join the psychic research organization ZENA.

=== Gear Detective ===
As part of an experiment with the organisation IXG, Kyosuke Ayana, who had lost his arm and eye, agreed to be given a technologically advanced prosthetic arm and a fake eye which artificially replicate the rare psychic ability chronokinesis. In the present, Kyosuke Ayana runs a detective agency alongside his self-proclaimed lover, Mari Sasamine. A young woman called Tsukiko Nagise arrives at the agency, claiming that she is being targeted by a serial killer. Investigations reveal that the culprit is a physic who is utilizing chronokinesis to commit seemingly impossible murders by altering the past. Kyosuke discovers that Tsukiko herself is the serial killer, and murdered his father, Gento Ayana.

Kyosuke learns that Gento was a researcher at an undisclosed PSI research laboratory within the country Witsarock. The laboratory kept psychic children as test subjects who were subjected to inhumane living conditions and experiments. Tsukiko was a test subject at this laboratory, where she befriended and grew extremely close to a fellow test subject named Ritsu, a powerful psychic. Ritsu and Tsukiko escaped the facility, which Ritsu destroyed with teleportation. Ritsu now wants to try and forge a world for psychics, and Tsukiko has been working to eliminate those who stand her way, independently from Ritsu. Kyosuke also discovers that his artificial arm and eye were created using this experimental data, which was brought by IXG.

After her plan to kill the CEO of Amabishi is foiled by Kyosuke, Mari, and Hitomi Akaneno, Tsukiko is told by Ritsu to stop doing what she has been doing. Distraught at being tossed aside, and seemingly without a purpose, Tsukiko flees to the basement where she plans to kill herself by igniting the ether crystals stored there. Kyosuke chases her down and is trapped in the basement with her. He is unable to persuade Tsukiko that she still has a reason to live, but his efforts on her behalf instill feelings of respect and affection for him, and she aids him in escaping. Once the path out of the storehouse is opened, however, she refuses to leave with Kyosuke.

==== Endings ====
- Normal ending: Tsukiko is not convinced by Kyosuke, and kills herself with the explosion. A distressed Mari stops acting as Kyosuke's assistant, and Kyosuke and Yukiya reflect on what went wrong.
- Gold star ending: Kyosuke tells Tsukiko that Mari wants to be her friend and leaves the storehouse without Tsukiko, reasoning that he has no control over Tsukiko's fate. Tsukiko is determined to become her own person, atone for her crimes, and be Mari and Kyosuke's friend, so she leaves the storehouse and turns herself over to the police. She awaits trial, and refuses all offers to minimise her punishment. As per a promise made during the course of the game, Kyosuke and Mari are engaged to be married. Crossing at the Farthest Horizon treats this ending as the canon one.
- Pink star ending: Starts off the same as the gold star ending. However, Tsukiko is released on parole via a special deal and begins working at Kyosuke's office. Tsukiko and Mari agree to share Kyosuke's romantic affections between the two of them. Kyosuke reflects on how strangely okay he is with the situation as he watches his two new girlfriends having fun with each other.

=== Crossing at the Farthest Horizon ===
Following the events of Cruise in the Distant Seas, Hitomi Akeneno has begun working at ZENA, a psychic research facility. After receiving a letter from someone claiming to be the Ghost of W, she travels to the country of Witsarock. Yukiya informs her that the Ghost is Ritsu Kamiji, Hitomi's sister. Ritsu is dying, and all her plans have been towards the end of setting Hitomi up as the heir to the nation of psychics she intends to create. Yukiya also admits he is in love with Ritsu, having fallen for her over the course of their negotiations in Gear Detective. Meanwhile, the newly engaged Kyosuke Ayana and Mari Sasamine are also lead to Witsarock in their hunt for Ritsu Kamiji. They attempt to meet up with private investigator Mr. Olek, only to find he has been murdered, and the "C" and "K" files stolen from his office.

Tsukiko is assigned to protect Hitomi during her trip. They find Ritsu not present at the planned meeting place because she has been betrayed by her ally Iori Mikasa, an expatriate Japanese woman who was foster mother to Ritsu and Tsukiko and is now a United States senator. Going through the romance novels Olek wrote under a pseudonym, Kyosuke, Mari, and Yukiya discover that the digital release of one of them has a hidden file containing proof that Mikasa was behind a series of human cloning experiments. Since the novel has already sold thousands of copies, Mikasa's career as a senator is ruined.

Mikasa kidnaps Hitomi and replaces her with an android called H-1 while Tsukiko is in the bathroom. Ritsu finds Hitomi in the Latoua Lab, guarded by an android of Ritsu who calls herself R-1. To avoid killing Hitomi in their battle, Ritsu and R-1 teleport away to a historic battlefield. While she fights R-1, Ritsu teleports to Yukiya's location to hand him a hastily scribbled memo telling him where Hitomi is. Yukiya also receives word of Ritsu and R-1's battle, so his group splits up, with Yukiya and Tsukiko going to Ritsu's aid while Kyosuke and Mari rescue Hitomi.

Tsukiko holds Mikasa at gunpoint to keep her from becoming involved in the battle. At Hitomi's insistence, Kyosuke and Mari bring her to the battlefield. Hitomi meets Ritsu face-to-face for the first time, and tells her she refuses to inherit her planned nation of psychics because she still considers herself a human and cannot see Ritsu as her sister until she embraces her own humanity. Ritsu admits that her hatred of humans was fueled by her feelings of helplessness and guilt over their parents being killed by the people who abducted her to use as a test subject. Hitomi and Ritsu then battle R-1 and H-1 together, synchronizing their dual psychic abilities to defeat the two androids.

Her plan foiled, Mikasa reveals that she was shot seven years ago on the battlefield they stand on, and points out that Kyosuke can undo all the harm she caused by simply going back in time and changing the bullet's trajectory so that it strikes her in the heart, killing her. Without her negative influence, Ritsu will never become a criminal mastermind and Tsukiko will never become a killer. Moreover, since Kyosuke always retains memories of the past as it was before he altered it, he can still arrange it so that he and Mari become friends with Tsukiko, and even reunite Hitomi and Ritsu much earlier.

==== Endings ====
- Normal ending: Kyosuke follows Mikasa's suggestion and changes the past. Kyosuke, Mari, Tsukiko, Hitomi, Yukiya, and Ritsu all become good friends. Kyosuke's father, feeling guilty over his role in the inhumane experimentation on psychics, remains reluctant to meet Tsukiko and Ritsu. While at first only he remembers the previous reality, Kyosuke breaks the secret to Tsukiko, who regains her memories of the previous reality though her chronokinesis. Though Tsukiko claims that she still does not have the feelings for Kyosuke she developed in the previous reality, she finagles a date with him.
- Gold star ending: Kyosuke destroys his arm implant, deciding that he no longer needs chronokinesis and wants to focus on shaping the future rather than changing the past. Since none of Mikasa and Ritsu's crimes ever became public knowledge, they are not tried for them, though Mikasa resigns her position as senator over the cloning scandal. Ritsu's terminal illness is cured with an operation which involves removing her PSI organ. Ritsu renounces her plan to build a nation of psychics, and uses the money intended for the plan to arrange for Misaki to be released and sent on a world tour, as a form of recompense for the way she used her. She also begins a romantic relationship with Yukiya. With Tsukiko on a work release arrangement, she and Ritsu become employed at Kyosuke's detective agency.
- Pink star ending: The same events as the gold star ending take place, except that no mention is made of Misaki, Ritsu is not employed at the detective agency, and on the same day Kyosuke is married to Mari and Yukiya is married to Ritsu.

== Gameplay ==
The games are visual novel adventure games, in which the player controls a psychic. In all three games players progress through conversations with characters, as well as use a menu to navigate their way around environments to gather information and progress the story. When the character needs to escape a locked room, the gameplay shifts into escape the room sections. While the first game doesn't define these segments, the sequel defines these into two distinct segments for the conversations with characters, and escape the room gameplay, called "Adventure" and "Investigation" sections, respectively. The third game further defines the segments, by making moments involving the player navigating environments to progress the story its own section called "map", wheres the escape the room segments are called "search". (Note: Based on the New Game Plus section skip feature, which names the sections as "adventure section", "map section", and "search section". This strands in contrast to the trailer which advertises these sections as just two segments called "adventure" and "investigation".)

Adventure gameplay

During "adventure" sections, the player engages in conversations with other characters. In the first game, this took the form of linear story progression, and the player being prompted with several topics to discuss. However the sequels replace this with the player being prompted to pick a response on occasion. "Map" sections involve the player visiting locations by using various menu commands to move between locations, and interact with people, and things in the current environment via determined prompts. The purpose of these sections is to find the right actions to progress towards a linear conclusion.

Search gameplay

During "search" sections, the player is tasked with finding a way past a lock of some sort, ordinarily to escape a location. To do this, they interact with the environment directly by touching various things. Interacting with objects prompts a list of available commands, such as "look", to examine the object in question, or "press", to press a switch. The player can pick up objects, which puts them into the inventory in the menu. Selecting the item, then interacting with something it can be used on, results in a new prompt to appear to use the item in question. The first game includes the "hint" option that allows the player to get a hint from the characters for one of the puzzles. The sequels replaced this with the option to make the protagonist "think", where it serves the same purpose.

Psychic abilities To solve the various puzzles during search gameplay, the player must use the protagonist's psychic abilities. In Cruise in the Distant Sea, Hitomi Akeneno's clairvoyance and telekinesis take the form of sections where the player must use clairvoyance to look behind a limited area of a surface. Then they use telekinesis to manipulate the area behind the surface to open a lock, or bring something out to a reachable place. This takes the form of a puzzle where they must navigate objects through maze to particular locations, or simply manipulate the environment in the right way. They have a limited number of "telekinesis points" and "clairvoyance points" to do this. In Gear Detective and Crossing at the Farthest Horizon, the player has access to Kyosuke Ayana's chronokenisis at most times during search sections. Using this, they can look into, and interact with, the past of the current environment for up to 5 days back, by selecting the number of days back, and the time (e.g. "3 days back - 14:30"). Using a timeline of the past, they can manipulate the environment of the past to alter past events or the past environment. This causes changes to the present and progresses the puzzles.

Endings and bonus modes With the exception of Cruise in the Distant Seas, the games have multiple endings, as well as a new game plus mode. The ending the player achieves is determined by stars earned at the end of each chapter: a gold star, pink star, or no star. The majority, or a lack of a majority, determines the ending, either good for gold, bad for none or no majority, or special for pink. The new game plus mode unlocks more options for responses upon a second playthrough, allowing more chances for gold and pink stars, which are required in both the second and third game in order to gain the special ending. During new game plus the player is also able to return to any chapter at any time, and are given the option to skip individual "adventure", "map", and "search" sections.

== Reception ==
Cruise in the Distant Seas received mixed reviews upon its release. Ryan Craddock of Nintendo Life gave the game an 8 out of 10, remarking that the story has an intrigue which makes it fun for the player to try to work out what is going on, as well as praising the visuals, the gameplay, and the hint system. However he felt the lengthy dialogue sections could feel "quite draining", especially given the lack of an option to save the game during these sections.

Gear Detective was generally well received, and considered a better follow-up to its predecessor than Crossing at the Farthest Horizon. FNintendo praised its well-written story, as well as its interesting puzzles, while being critical of the low production value of its audio visuals. They however stated that the gameplay and overall story was solid enough for it to deserve attention, especially for its low price tag, giving it 7 out of 10. Jason Nason of Darkain Arts Gamers stated that the characters were well fleshed out, and also praised the game's script, and stated that while there were a few "translations hiccups", it was limited and the translators did a "solid job". He was also positive towards the music, which he stated was "pleasing to listen to", and overall considered the game a solid pick for its low price.
