= Ritsu and ryo scales =

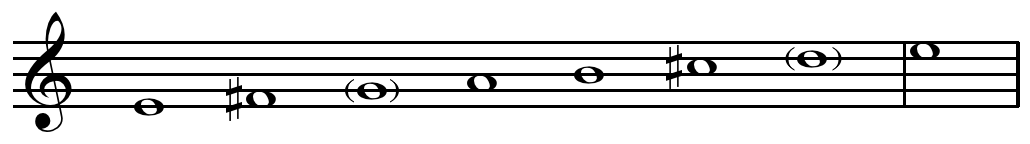
Ritsu scale with secondary tones in brackets. E, F♯, (G,) A, B, C♯, (D,)

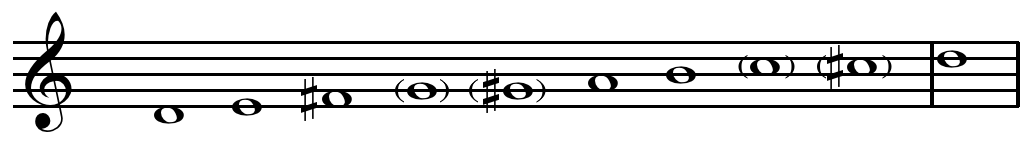
Ryo scale with secondary tones in brackets D, E, F♯, (G/G♯), A, B, (C/C♯).

The ritsu and ryo scales are anhemitonic pentatonic scales -- five-note scales without semitones -- used in a type of Japanese Buddhist chant called shōmyō. The ritsu (律) scale is built up by intervals of major second, minor third, major second, major second, minor third, while the ryo (呂) scale is major second, major second, minor third, major second, minor third. A third, hybrid scale called hanryo hanritsu (半呂半律, literally "half-ryo, half-ritsu), is created by combining the ritsu and ryo scales; however, there is no agreed way to combine the two.

The ritsu scales do not fit exactly into the equal temperament prominent in Western classical music but ritsu is transposable to E and B, Ryo is transposable to D and G, and Hanryo hanritsu to A. The ritsu scale is one of the six scales (along with the major and minor scales, the common pentatonic scale, and the common "blues" scale) that provide more consonant harmonic intervals than any other possible scales that can be drawn from the 12 semitones of equally tempered pitch.

== Esoteric significance ==
The ritsu scale is the voice of the male phoenix, yang, being, the voice that ascends from above and is inhaled breath, emerging from the ki while the ryo scale is the voice of the female phoenix, yin, nothingness, the voice that ascends from below and is exhaled breath, emerging from the breath; probably indicating that ritsu is vertical and ryo is horizontal.
