= Yongquan Temple (Zhouzhi County) =

Buddhist temple in Zhouzhi County, Shaanxi, China

- 涌泉寺

Religion
- Affiliation: Buddhism
- Deity: Chan Buddhism
- Leadership: Shi Daoyan (释道严)

Location
- Location: Zhouzhi County, Shaanxi
- Country: China
- Interactive map of Yongquan Temple
- Coordinates: 34°03′47″N 108°11′49″E

Architecture
- Style: Chinese architecture
- Established: Tang dynasty
- Completed: 2005 (reconstruction)

Yongquan Temple (Chinese: 涌泉寺; pinyin: Yǒngquán Sì) is a Buddhist temple located at the foot of Mount Cuiwei (翠微山), in Mazhao Town of Zhouzhi County, Shaanxi province, China. It is a Buddhist temple for Bhikkhuni. The temple is situated approximately 70 kilometres (43 mi) west of the provincial capital of Xi'an.

== Name ==
The name of the Yongquan Temple derives from a spring named "Yongquan" (涌泉), which flows through the temple.

== History ==
Yongquan Temple was first built in the Tianbao period (742–756) of the Tang dynasty (618–907), and rebuilt in 1343, in the 3rd year of Zhizheng period (1341–1368) of the Yuan dynasty (1271–1368).

Yongquan Temple underwent three renovations in the Ming dynasty (1368–1644), respectively in the ruling of Jingtai Emperor (1450–1456) and in the reign of Hongzhi Emperor (1488–1505) and in the Jiajing period (1522–1566).

During the 1930s, the temple was a base of the underground Party of the Chinese Communist Party.

The modern temple was founded in 2005.
