= Iwato scale =

Scale used in Japanese music

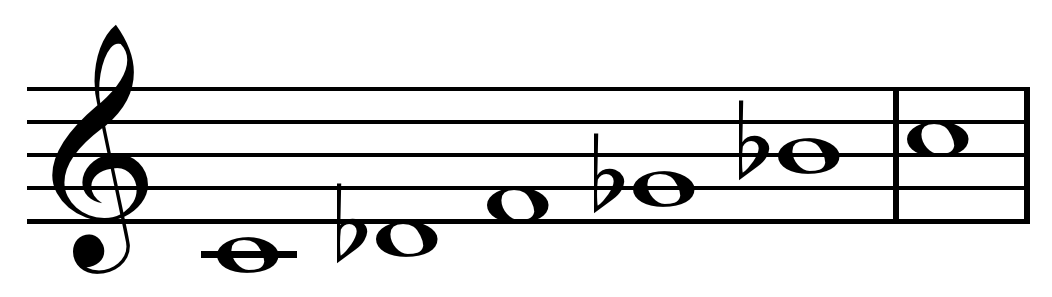
Iwato scale on C. Piggott gives C-D-E♭-G-A♭. (Iwato scale on D)

The iwato scale is a musical scale that is similar to the Locrian mode (spelled 1 b2 b3 4 b5 b6 b7), seventh mode of the major scale, different in that it has no 3rd or 6th notes, thus making it pentatonic. Its spelling is therefore 1 b2 4 b5 b7. It is used in traditional Japanese music for the koto. It is a mode of the hirajōshi scale.
