= Japanese mode =

Musical scale commonly used in Japan

The Japanese mode is a pentatonic musical scale commonly used in traditional Japanese music. The intervals of the scale are major second, minor third, perfect fifth and minor sixth (such as the notes A, B, C, E, F and up to A ja:ヨナ抜き音階.), essentially a natural minor scale in Western music theory without the subdominant and subtonic, the same operation performed on the major scale to produce the pentatonic major scale. The more correct term would be kumoijoshi, as given by William P. Malm for one of the three tuning scales of the koto adapted from shamisen music.

Since the Heian period, there has been disagreement and contention among musical scholars regarding Japanese music and modal theory, and no single modal theory or scale model exists that can completely explain or identify Japanese music. The variations of Japanese modal scales are often compared to the western major scale. The classical structures of most Japanese music originated in China, and no attempt to develop a universal scale or mode occurred until Western music had been imported. After the Heian period began, Western modal theories became widely acknowledged by Japanese society, though often maintained in their own category as they could not entirely explain Japanese music across all of its iterations.

== History ==
Evidence of music in Japan before the 6th century is present, but very limited knowledge surrounding its theory exists. A consistent form of Japanese music did not appear to occur until the Nara period. During this period, gagaku court music was introduced from China and then modified to fit Japanese styles and taste. Similar to Buddhism and Confucianism, music and musical instruments were also introduced from China in the 12th century. These musical theories, instruments and styles came to shape much of the traditional Japanese music that is known today. Though much of the Chinese music and theory was repurposed for distinct Japanese styles, it still retained many of the core elements of Chinese traditional music of the time. The standard theory imported from China consisted of an octave scale with 12 pitches derived from the circle of fifths. During the Edo period, Japan was shut off from the rest of the world and many new musical styles arose from this isolation and shaped modern Japanese music. It is theorized that this is among the reasons that music theorists find difficulty developing a single theoretical solution for all Japanese music.

== Types of Japanese scales and modes ==
Gagaku scale: Introduced from China during the Nara Period, but then later modified during the Heian Period, the Gagaku scale is a heptatonic scale, created from 12 chromatic tones and assembled by fifths.

In scale and yo scale: Uehara Rokushiro coined these two scales in the late 1800s. They were among the first scales developed as a scholarly approach to Japanese music. Both scales use a H W H W H pattern, but the Yo scale differs as three of its degrees are sharped.

Minyo scale and Ritsu scale: There are various arrangements of notes that historians may consider to be Minyo and Ritsu scales, but they are usually classified as five-note scales without any semitones. They may be classified by a major second, minor Third, major second and minor third.
