= Shōmyō =

Style of Japanese Buddhist chant

Shōmyō (声明) is a style of Japanese Buddhist chant, used mainly in the Tendai and Shingon traditions. There are two styles: ryokyoku (呂曲) and rikkyoku (律曲), described as difficult and easy to remember, respectively.

Shōmyō, like gagaku, employs the yo scale, a pentatonic scale with ascending intervals of two, three, two, two, and three semitones.

== History ==
An early reference to Buddhist chanting in Japanese history is a ceremony being held at the time of the kaigen ceremony for the Daibutsu (大仏, Great Buddha of Tōdai-ji) in 752, and it is believed that chanting was widely practiced during the Nara period (710-794).

In the early Heian period (794-1331), Kūkai and Saichō each transmitted chanting styles they had inherited when studying Buddhism in China, which eventually became the basis for the chanting styles of Shingon and Tendai. The Tale of Genji, a crucial work of classical Japanese literature written during this period, frequently mentions memorial services performed by monks from Mount Hiei, where Tendai chanting was utilized. In addition, Buddhist traditions other than Shingon and Tendai also have their own chanting styles, which are still passed down today.

Buddhist vocal music introduced from China during the Heian period was called the "Voice of Brahmā" (梵唄, Bonbai). This remains the term used for chanting styles in both Chinese and Korean Buddhism, where the same Chinese characters are read as fanbai and beompae, respectively. The study of the Siddhaṃ script, used to write Buddhist texts in Sanskrit, also became popular. Eventually, the term shōmyō came to denote the combination of Siddhaṃ studies and the recitation of texts; from the medieval period onwards, it referred only to the recitation of texts.

Because shōmyō was passed down orally, there was initially no equivalent to musical notation in modern music theory. This made transmission extremely difficult. Later, the equivalent of musical notation would be developed, with technical terms referring to the notation varying across Buddhist schools. However, the notations were merely a reference for chanting, and to formally master shōmyō, oral transmission (口伝, kuden)), or face-to-face instruction by a teacher, was essential. Without face-to-face instruction, the school could not be maintained or passed on from teacher to student. For this reason, it was essential to train instructors and successors.

Before the medieval period, shōmyō was difficult to understand, not only for ordinary Japanese people but also for Buddhist monks. As a result, there was a demand for easy-to-understand shōmyō with lyrics in Japanese, and a form of shōmyō called lecture ceremony (講式, kōshiki) was created. Because Kōshiki was made up of a musical structure that deviated from the conventions of existing shōmyō, a new method of notation was devised. Kōshiki had a major influence on the development of Japanese music, such as the yōkyoku used in Noh plays.

== Transmissions ==
=== Tendai transmission ===
Tendai shōmyō was originally promoted by Saichō, the Tendai founder, based on what he had learnt during his studies in China. After him, it was further promoted by successive Tendai monks, including Ennin and Annen. Ryōnin, who later became the founder of Yuzu Nembutsu school of Pure Land Buddhism, was also a prominent promoter of shōmyō. In 1109, he built Raigo-in in Ohara, Kyoto. The sangō (mountain name) of Raigo-in Temple in Ohara was Gyozan (魚山), after a mountain of the same name in Shandong, China, which is regarded as the birthplace of fanbai. Eventually, Raigo-in and another temple, Shorin-in, became known as training centers for a style called Ohara Gyozan shōmyō (大原魚山声明)). The Tendai monk Jakugen formed another tradition of shōmyō in Ohara, and Sokai revived Ohara chanting.

During the early Kamakura period (1185-1333), the monk Tanchi (湛智) developed a systemic musical theory for shōmyō, which eventually became the core of Tendai shōmyō and has been inherited into current Tendai shōmyō. The shōmyō of the Yuzu Nembutsu, Jōdo-shū, and Jōdo Shinshū traditions are lineages of Tendai shōmyō.

=== Shingon transmission ===
The foundation of Shingon shōmyō was passed down by Kōbō Daishi and has been transmitted continuously down to contemporary times. Several eminent monks who promoted the Shingon style of shōmyō includes Shinga, who systematized Shingon shōmyō, and Kancho, who led a revival of Shingon shōmyō by composing new chants and maintaining existing ones.

==== Four schools ====
Until the Kamakura period, there were many schools of Shingon shōmyō, but under Prince Kakusho, who was also a monk, they were consolidated into four schools: Honsoin-ryū (本相応院流), Shinsoin-ryū (新相応院流), Daigo-ryū (醍醐流) and Nakagawa Daishin-ryū (中川大進流).

The Honsoin-ryu, Shinsoin-ryū and Daigo-ryū were all abolished by the mid-Meiji period (1868-1912), with only Nakagawa Daishin-ryū remaining. Currently, the Nakagawa Daishin-ryū style of Shingon shōmyō is divided into three main schools: Chizan Shōmyō (智山声明) from Chishaku-in in Kyoto, Buzan Shōmyō (豊山声明) from Hasedera in Nara and Nanzan Shinryū (南山進流) from Kōyasan in Kyoto.

===== Chizan Shōmyō and Buzan Shōmyō =====
- Shingon-shū Chisan-ha and Shingon-shū Buzan-ha shōmyō: The styles of both these traditions of Shingon originated in the Nakagawa Daishin-ryū. When Negoro-ji in Wakayama Prefecture was burned down by Toyotomi Hideyoshi in 1583, its practices were reformed into a single tradition based on the old Daigo-ryū.

=== Nanzan Shinryu ===
- Nanzan Shinryu: Originated from the Nakagawa Daishin-ryū school as well. During the Jōei era (1232-1233), the monk Katsushin (勝心) of Sanbo-in on Kōyasan requested the monk Jigyō (慈業) of Nakagawa-dera in Nara (where the Nakagawa Daishin-ryū style was developed) to move his base to Kōyasan. Later, "Nanzan" (南山, lit: "Southern Mountain"), another name for Kōyasan, and was added to the name of the style to form "Nanzan Shinryū".

== See also ==
- Buddhist music
- Buddhist liturgy, which is performed through shōmyō
- Fanbai, Chinese style of Buddhist chants similar to shōmyō
- Beompae, Korean style of Buddhist chants similar to shōmyō

== Bibliography ==
- Hill, Jackson (1982). Ritual Music in Japanese Esoteric Buddhism: Shingon shōmyō, Ethnomusicology 26 (1), 27-39
