= Beompae =

Korean Buddhist musical genre

- Hangul: 범패
- Hanja: 梵唄
- RR: beompae
- MR: pŏmp'ae

Beompae (Korean: 범패; Hanja: 梵唄) is a Korean genre of Buddhist chants and songs, and is a traditional Korean song category. Other such examples include gagok and pansori).

== Description ==
There are three kinds of beompae:

- anchaebi sori (안채비 소리), "indoor chant", musically simple, sutra chants, mainly in Chinese, sung by a monk, usually inside a temple.
- baggatchaebi sori (바깥채비 소리), "outdoor chant", the solemn recitation of specific Chinese poems, either as hotsori (홋소리) "simple chant", or jitsori (짓소리) "long chant". Sung in a characteristic high pitch by a trained professional singer and monk, for special ritual occasions. The term boempae sometimes refers specifically to these kinds of chants, the most ancient of Korean Buddhist ritual chants.
- hwacheong (화청), secular Buddhist ritual chants, in vernacular Korean, easily understood by listeners.

== History ==
Beompae developed since the Three Kingdoms period, when Buddhism enjoyed official patronage as Korea's dominant religion. It declined during the Joseon dynasty, when Confucianism was promoted, and during the Japanese era, when Korea's traditional Buddhist culture was repressed.

== See also ==
- Culture of Korea
- Korean music
