= Bairagi (raga) =

Hindustani classical raga

- Thaat: Bhairav
- Time of day: 6 AM – 9 AM
- Arohana: Sa re ma Pa ni Sa‘
- Avarohana: Sa‘ni Pa ma re Sa
- Pakad: m-P-n-P-m-r;‘n r S
- Vadi: Madhyam (ma)
- Samavadi: Shadj (Sa)
- Synonym: Bairagi Bhairav
- Equivalent: Revati (Carnatic); Insen scale (Japan)

Bairagi (raga), also known as Bairagi bhairav, is a Hindustani classical raga.

Thaat: Bhairav

Jati: Audav

Aaroh: sa, komal re, ma, pa, komal ni sa*

Avroh: sa*, komal ni, pa, ma, komal re, sa

Pakad: ni re ma pa, ni pa ni, ni ma re ni re sa

Vadi: ma

Samvadi: Sa

Time: Early morning

== Film Songs ==
=== Language:Hindi ===
Song	Movie	Composer	Singer
I Love My India	Pardes	Nadeem-Shravan	Kavitha Krishnamurthy, Hariharan, Aditya Narayan, Shankar Mahadevan

=== Language:Tamil ===
Note that the following songs are composed in Revati, the equivalent of raga Bairagi Bhairav in Carnatic music.

Song	Movie	Composer	Singer
Illam Sangeetham Athil	Avan Aval Adhu	M. S. Viswanathan	S. P. Balasubrahmanyam, Vani Jairam
Mandhira Punnagai	Manal Kayiru	M. S. Viswanathan	S. P. Balasubrahmanyam, B. S. Sasireka
Viral Meetaal	Pennai Solli Kutramillai	M. S. Viswanathan	P. Susheela
Maragatha Megam	Meegathukum Thaagam undu	M. S. Viswanathan	S. P. Balasubrahmanyam, P. Susheela
Ninaithaal Unaithan	Unnidathil Naan (1986)	Thayanban	K.J. Yesudas, Vani Jairam
Anandha Thagam	Vaa Indha Pakkam	Shyam	Deepan Chakravarthy, S. Janaki
Kanavu Ondru	Oru Odai Nadhiyagirathu	Illayaraja	S. Janaki
Sangeetha Jathimullai	Kaadhal Oviyam	Illayaraja	S. P. Balasubrahmanyam
Durga Durga	Priyanka	Illayaraja	K. S. Chithra
Adadaa Aghangaara Arakka Kaigalil	Pithamagan	Illayaraja	K.J. Yesudas
Kannurangu Ponmayile	Idhu Namma Aalu	K. Bhagyaraj	K.J. Yesudas
Bhuvaneswari Arul	Thaye Neeye Thunai	Raveendran	K.J. Yesudas, K. S. Chithra
Vizhigal Meydaiyam Imaigal	Kilinjalgal	Vijaya T. Rajendar	Kalyan, S. Janaki
Kaakha Kaakha	Naan Avanillai	Vijay Antony	Vijay Antony, Charulatha Mani, Megha, Vinaya, Maya
