= Pentatonic scale =

Type of musical scale

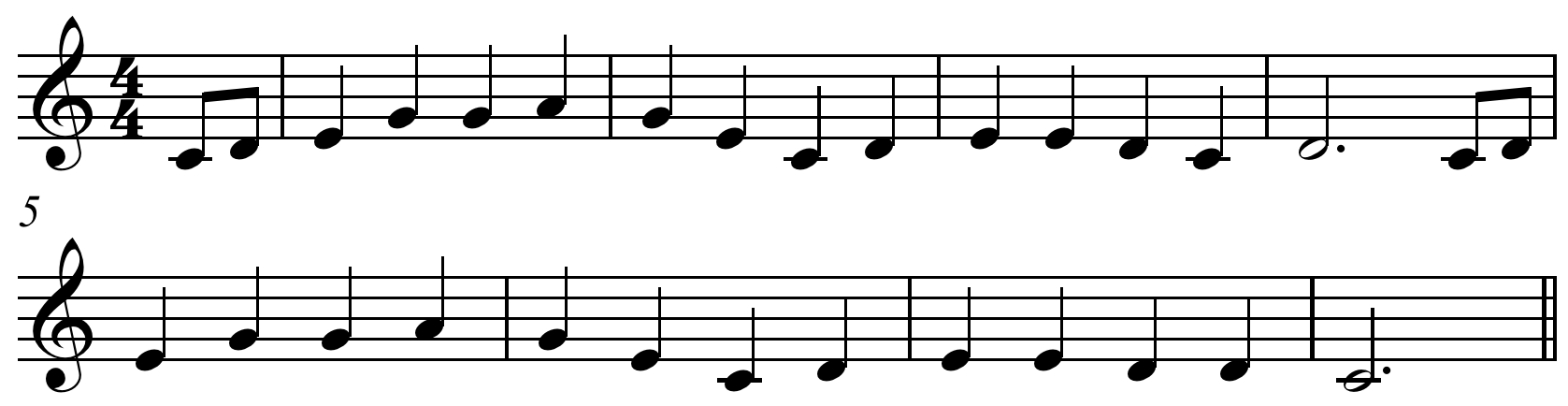
The first two phrases of the melody from Stephen Foster's "Oh! Susanna" are based on the major pentatonic scale

A pentatonic scale is a musical scale with five notes per octave, in contrast to heptatonic scales, which have seven notes per octave (such as the major scale and minor scale).

Pentatonic scales were developed independently by many ancient civilizations and are still used in various musical styles to this day. As Leonard Bernstein put it: "The universality of this scale is so well known that I'm sure you could give me examples of it, from all corners of the earth, as from Scotland, or from China, or from Africa, and from American Indian cultures, from East Indian cultures, from Central and South America, Australia, Finland ... now, that is a true musico-linguistic universal." There are two types of pentatonic scales: those with semitones (hemitonic) and those without (anhemitonic).

== Types ==
=== Hemitonic and anhemitonic ===
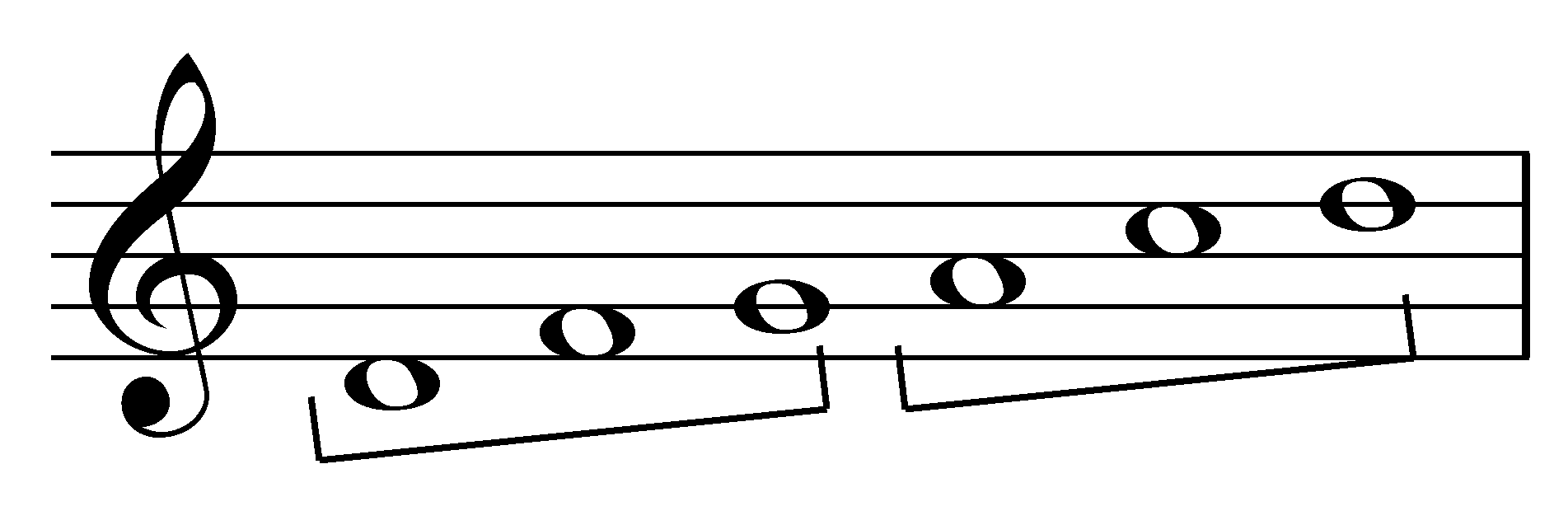
Minyō scale on D, equivalent to yo scale on C, with brackets on fourths

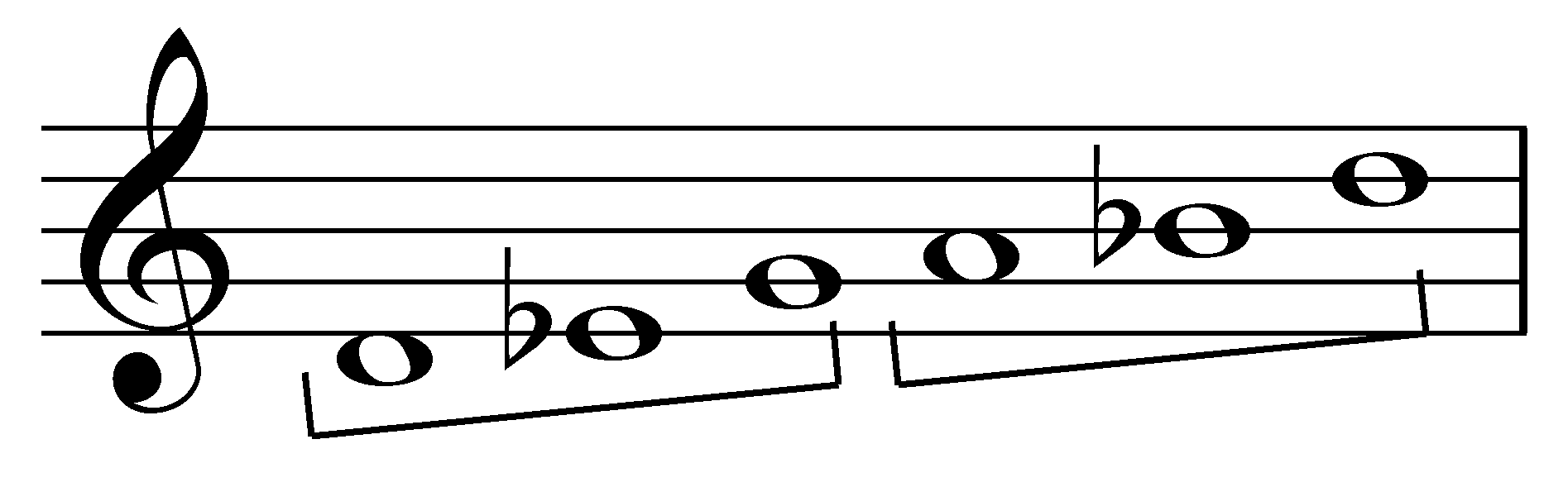
Miyako-bushi scale on D, equivalent to in scale on D, with brackets on fourths

Musicology commonly classifies pentatonic scales as either hemitonic or anhemitonic. Hemitonic scales contain one or more semitones and anhemitonic scales do not contain semitones. (For example, in Japanese music the anhemitonic yo scale is contrasted with the hemitonic in scale.) Hemitonic pentatonic scales are also called "ditonic scales", because the largest interval in them is the ditone (e.g., in the scale C–E–F–G–B–C, the interval found between C–E and G–B). (This should not be confused with the identical term also used by musicologists to describe a scale including only two notes.)

=== Major pentatonic scale ===
Anhemitonic pentatonic scales can be constructed in many ways. The major pentatonic scale may be thought of as a gapped or incomplete major scale, using scale tones 1, 2, 3, 5, and 6 of the major scale. One construction takes five consecutive pitches from the circle of fifths; starting on C, these are C, G, D, A, and E. Rearranging the pitches to fit into one octave creates the major pentatonic scale: C, D, E, G, A.

Another construction works backward: It omits two pitches from a diatonic scale. If one were to begin with a C major scale, for example, one might omit the fourth and the seventh scale degrees, F and B. The remaining notes then make up the major pentatonic scale: C, D, E, G, and A.

Omitting the third and seventh degrees of the C major scale obtains the notes for another transpositionally equivalent anhemitonic pentatonic scale: F, G, A, C, D. Omitting the first and fourth degrees of the C major scale gives a third anhemitonic pentatonic scale: G, A, B, D, E.

The black keys on a piano keyboard comprise a G♭ (or equivalently, F♯) major pentatonic scale: G♭, A♭, B♭, D♭, and E♭, which is exploited in Chopin's black key étude.

=== Minor pentatonic scale ===
Although various hemitonic pentatonic scales might be called minor, the term is most commonly applied to the relative minor pentatonic derived from the major pentatonic, using scale tones 1, ♭3, 4, 5, and ♭7 of the natural minor scale. (It may also be considered a gapped blues scale.) The C minor pentatonic scale, the relative minor of the E♭ pentatonic scale, is C, E♭, F, G, B♭. The A minor pentatonic, the relative minor of C pentatonic, comprises the same tones as the C major pentatonic, starting on A, giving A, C, D, E, G. This minor pentatonic contains all three tones of an A minor triad.

The standard tuning of a guitar uses the notes of an E minor pentatonic scale: E–A–D–G–B–E, contributing to its frequency in popular music. Stevie Wonder employed the minor pentatonic for the funky clavinet riff on the track "Superstition" (1972).

=== Japanese scale ===
The Japanese mode is based on the Phrygian mode, but uses scale tones 1, 2, 4, 5, and 6 instead of scale tones 1, 3, 4, 5, and 7.

== Modes of the pentatonic scale ==
The pentatonic scale (containing notes C, D, E, G, and A) has five modes, which are derived by treating a different note as the tonic:

Tonic	Name(s)	Chinese pentatonic scale	Indian pentatonic scale	On C	White key transpositions			Black key transposition
Tonic	Name(s)	Chinese pentatonic scale	Indian pentatonic scale	On C	C major pentatonic	F major pentatonic	G major pentatonic	F♯/G♭ major pentatonic
1 (C)	Major pentatonic	宮 (gōng) mode	Hindustani – Bhoopali; Carnatic – Mohanam; Tamil – Mullaittīmpāṇi	C–D–E–G–A–C	C–D–E–G–A–C	F–G–A–C–D–F	G–A–B–D–E–G	G♭–A♭–B♭–D♭–E♭–G♭
2 (D)	Suspended, Egyptian	商 (shāng) mode	Hindustani – Megh; Carnatic – Madhyamavati; Tamil – Centurutti	C–D–F–G–B♭–C	D–E–G–A–C–D	G–A–C–D–F–G	A–B–D–E–G–A	A♭–B♭–D♭–E♭–G♭–A♭
3 (E)	Blues minor, Man Gong (Guqin tunings)	角 (jué) mode	Hindustani – Malkauns; Carnatic – Hindolam; Tamil – Intaḷam	C–E♭–F–A♭–B♭–C	E–G–A–C–D–E	A–C–D–F–G–A	B–D–E–G–A–B	B♭–D♭–E♭–G♭–A♭–B♭
5 (G)	Blues major, ritsusen, yo scale	徵 (zhǐ) mode	Hindustani – Durga; Carnatic – Shuddha Saveri; Tamil – Koṉṟai	C–D–F–G–A–C	G–A–C–D–E–G	C–D–F–G–A–C	D–E–G–A–B–D	D♭–E♭–G♭–A♭–B♭–D♭
6 (A)	Minor pentatonic	羽 (yǔ) mode	Hindustani – Dhani; Carnatic – Shuddha Dhanyasi; Tamil – āmpal	C–E♭–F–G–B♭–C	A–C–D–E–G–A	D–F–G–A–C–D	E–G–A–B–D–E	E♭–G♭–A♭–B♭–D♭–E♭

Ricker assigned the major pentatonic scale mode I while Gilchrist assigned it mode III.

=== Relationship to diatonic modes ===
Each mode of the pentatonic scale (containing notes C, D, E, G, and A) can be thought of as the five scale degrees shared by three different diatonic modes with the two remaining scale degrees removed:

Each pentatonic scale can be thought of as the five notes shared by three different diatonic modes.

Pentatonic mode	Tonic note	Based on modes (Diatonic scale)	Base scale degrees	Modifications	Interval sequence
Major	C	Lydian mode; Ionian mode (Natural Major); Mixolydian mode	I–II–III–V–VI	Omit 4 7	W–W–3/2–W–3/2
Blues major	G	Ionian mode (Natural Major); Mixolydian mode; Dorian mode	I–II–IV–V–VI	Omit 3 7	W–3/2–W–W–3/2
Suspended	D	Mixolydian mode; Dorian mode; Aeolian mode (Natural minor)	I–II–IV–V–VII	Omit 3 6	W–3/2–W–3/2–W
Minor	A	Dorian mode; Aeolian mode (Natural minor); Phrygian mode	I–III–IV–V–VII	Omit 2 6	3/2–W–W–3/2–W
Blues minor	E	Aeolian mode (Natural minor); Phrygian mode; Locrian mode	I–III–IV–VI–VII	Omit 2 5	3/2–W–3/2–W–W

=== Intervals from tonic ===
Each mode of the pentatonic scale (containing notes C, D, E, G, and A) features different intervals of notes from the tonic according to the table below. Note the omission of the semitones above (m2) and below (M7) the tonic as well as the tritone (TT).

The intervals used in the pentatonic scale compared to the diatonic scale.

Pentatonic mode	Tonic note	Intervals with respect to the tonic					
Pentatonic mode	Tonic note	unison	second note	third note	fourth note	fifth note	octave
Major	C	P1	M2	M3	P5	M6	P8
Blues major	G	P1	M2	P4	P5	M6	P8
Suspended	D	P1	M2	P4	P5	m7	P8
Minor	A	P1	m3	P4	P5	m7	P8
Blues minor	E	P1	m3	P4	m6	m7	P8

== Tuning ==
=== Pythagorean tuning ===
Ben Johnston gives the following Pythagorean tuning for the minor pentatonic scale:

A minor pentatonic scale in Pythagorean tuning

Note	Solfege	A	C	D	E	G	A
Note	Ratio	1/1	32/27	4/3	3/2	16/9	2/1
Note	Natural	54	64	72	81	96	108
Note	Audio	1	3	4	5	7	8
Step	Name		m3	T	T	m3	T
Step	Ratio		32/27	9/8	9/8	32/27	9/8

Naturals in that table are not the alphabetic series A to G without sharps and flats: Naturals are reciprocals of terms in the Harmonic series (mathematics), which are in practice multiples of a fundamental frequency. This may be derived by proceeding with the principle that historically gives the Pythagorean diatonic and chromatic scales, stacking perfect fifths with 3:2 frequency proportions (C–G–D–A–E). Considering the anhemitonic scale as a subset of a just diatonic scale, it is tuned thus: 20:24:27:30:36 (A–C–D–E–G = 5/6–1/1–9/8–5/4–3/2).

=== Just intonation ===
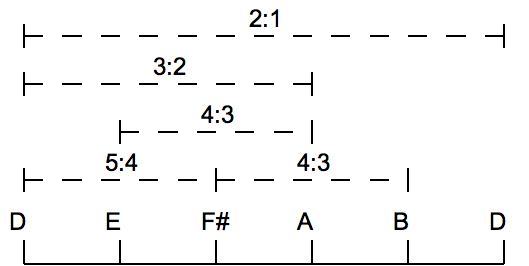
Just pentatonic tuning of Lou Harrison's "American gamelan", Old Granddad. This gives the proportions 24:27:30:36:40.

Modes	Ratios (just)
Major	24:27:30:36:40
Blues major	24:27:32:36:40
Suspended	24:27:32:36:42
Minor	30:36:40:45:54
Blues minor	15:18:20:24:27

(A minor seventh can be 7:4, 16:9, or 9:5; a major sixth can be 27:16 or 5:3. Both were chosen to minimize ratio parts.)

=== Other ===
Assigning precise frequency proportions to the pentatonic scales of most cultures is problematic as tuning may be variable.

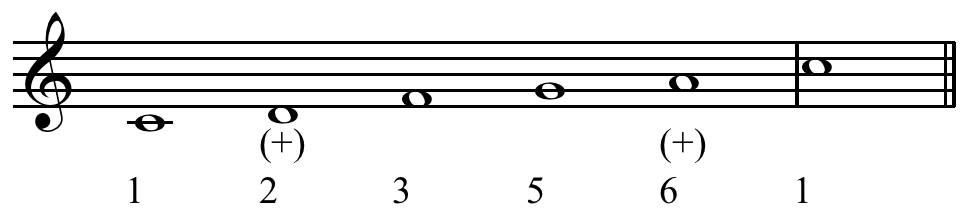
Slendro approximated in Western notation.

For example, the slendro anhemitonic scale and its modes of Java and Bali are said to approach, very roughly, an equally-tempered five-note scale, but their tunings vary dramatically from gamelan to gamelan.

Composer Lou Harrison has been one of the most recent proponents and developers of new pentatonic scales based on historical models. Harrison and William Colvig tuned the slendro scale of the gamelan Si Betty to overtones 16:19:21:24:28 (1/1–19/16–21/16–3/2–7/4). They tuned the Mills gamelan so that the intervals between scale steps are 8:7–7:6–9:8–8:7–7:6 (1/1–8/7–4/3–3/2–12/7–2/1 = 42:48:56:63:72)

== Use of pentatonic scales ==
=== Overview ===
Pentatonic scales occur in many musical traditions:

- Stone Age flutes
- Indian classical music, both Hindustani and Carnatic traditions
- Ancient Tamil music, see the Section "Evolution of panns".
- Peruvian Chicha cumbia
- Indigenous ethnic folk music of Assam
- Sudanese Music
- Celtic folk music
- English folk music
- German folk music
- Nordic folk music
- Hungarian folk music
- Croatian folk music
- Berber music
- West African music
- African-American spirituals
- Gospel music
- Bluegrass music
- American folk music
- Music of Ethiopia
- Jazz
- Blues
- Rock music
- Sami joik singing
- Children's song
- The music of ancient Greece
  - Greek traditional music and polyphonic songs from Epirus in northwest Greece
- Music of southern Albania
- Folk songs of peoples of the Middle Volga region (such as the Mari, the Chuvash and Tatars)
- The tuning of the Ethiopian krar and the Indonesian gamelan
- Philippine kulintang
- Native American music, especially in highland South America (the Quechua and Aymara), as well as among the North American Indians of the Pacific Northwest
- Most Turkic, Mongolic and Tungusic music of Siberia and the Asiatic steppe is written in the pentatonic scale
- Melodies of Eastern Asia: China, Korea, Laos, Thailand, Cambodia, Malaysia, Japan, and Vietnam (including the folk music of these countries)
  - Traditional Japanese court music
  - Shōmyō chanting
- Andean music
- Afro-Caribbean music
- Polish highlanders from the Tatra Mountains

=== Example details ===
==== In classical music ====
Examples of its use include:

Beethoven, Quartet in F major, Op. 135, finale:

Beethoven Quartet Op 135, finale bars 250-7

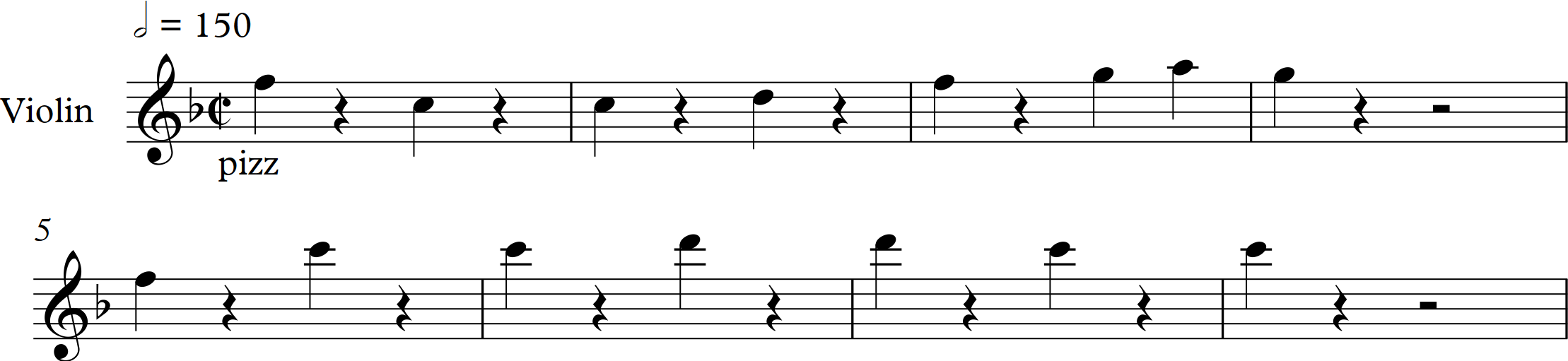
Beethoven Quartet Op 135, finale bars 250-7

Chopin's Etude in G♭ major, Op. 10, No. 5, the "Black Key" etude, in the major pentatonic.

Chopin Etude Op. 10 No. 5

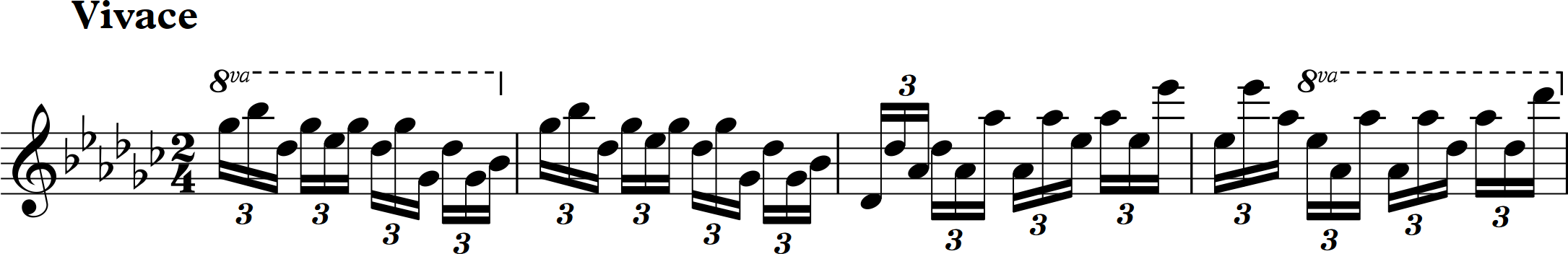
Chopin Etude Op. 10 No. 5

Western Impressionistic composers such as French composer Claude Debussy and Maurice Ravel used the pentatonic scale extensively in their works.

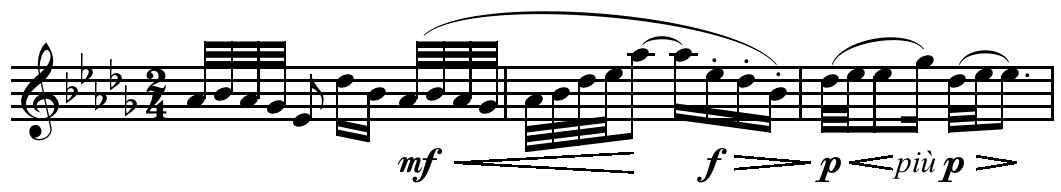
Pentatonic scale in Debussy's Voiles, Preludes, Book I, no. 2, mm. 43–45.

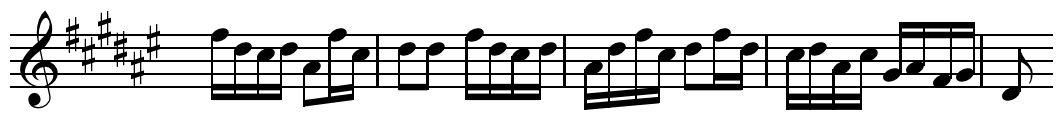
Pentatonic scale in Ravel's Ma mère l'Oye III. "Laideronnette, Impératrice des Pagodes", mm. 9–13.

Giacomo Puccini used pentatonic scales in his operas Madama Butterfly and Turandot to imitate east Asian musical styles. Puccini also used whole-tone scales in the former to evoke similar ideas.

==== Indian ragas ====
Indian classical music has hundreds of ragas, of which many are pentatonic. Examples include Raag Abhogi Kanada (C, D, E♭, F, A), Raag Bhupali (C, D, E, G, A), Raag Bairagi (C, D♭, F, G, B♭), Raag Chandrakauns (C, E♭, F, A♭, B), Raag Dhani (C, E♭, F, G, B♭), Raag Durga (C, D, F, G, A), Raag Gunakari (C, D♭, F, G, A♭), Raag Hamsadhwani (C, D, E, G, B), Raag Hindol (C, E, F#, A, B), Raag Kalavati (C, E, G, A, B♭), Raag Katyayani (C, D, E♭, G, A♭), Raag Malkauns (C, E♭, F, A♭, B♭), Raag Megh (C, D, F, G, B♭), Raag Shivaranjani (C, D, E♭, G, A), Raag Shuddha Sarang (C, D, F#, G, B), Raag Tilang (C, E, F, G, B), Raag Vibhas (C, D♭, E, G, A♭), Raag Vrindavani Sarang (C, D, F, G, B), and others.

(For Tamil Music System, See here - Ancient Tamil music#Evolution of panns )

==== Further Asian pentatonic musical traditions ====
The major pentatonic scale is the basic scale of the music of China and the music of Mongolia as well as many Southeast Asian musical traditions such as that of the Karen people as well as the indigenous Assamese ethnic groups. The pentatonic scale predominates most Eastern countries as opposed to Western countries where the heptatonic scale is more commonly used.

Japanese Shakuhachi

D Yo scale

The fundamental tones (without meri or kari techniques) rendered by the five holes of the Japanese shakuhachi flute play a minor pentatonic scale. The yo scale used in Japanese shomyo Buddhist chants and gagaku imperial court music is an anhemitonic pentatonic scale shown here, which is the fourth mode of the major pentatonic scale.

Javanese Gamelan (Indonesia)

Temperated pentatoncs

In Javanese gamelan music, the Slendro scale has five tones, of which four are emphasized in classical music. The five tones of Slendro are traditionally characterized by relatively even intervals. In terms of equal divisions of the octave, this is broadly comparable to 5-tone equal temperament (5-TET or 5-EDO), although actual Slendro tunings vary between gamelan ensembles and do not necessarily correspond exactly to a mathematically equal division of the octave. Another scale, Pelog, has seven tones, and is generally played using one of three five-tone subsets known as pathet which are Pathet Nem, Pathet Barang, and Pathet Limå, in which certain notes are avoided while others are emphasized.

==== Somali ====
Somali music uses a distinct modal system that is pentatonic, with characteristically long intervals between some notes. As with many other aspects of Somali culture and tradition, tastes in music and lyrics are strongly linked with those in nearby Ethiopia, Eritrea, Djibouti and Sudan.

==== Insular Celtic ====
In Scottish music, the pentatonic scale is very common. Seumas MacNeill suggests that the Great Highland bagpipe scale with its augmented fourth and diminished seventh is "a device to produce as many pentatonic scales as possible from its nine notes" (although these two features are not in the same scale). Roderick Cannon explains these pentatonic scales and their use in more detail, both in Piobaireachd and light music. It also features in Irish traditional music, either purely or almost so. The minor pentatonic is used in Appalachian folk music.

==== Andean ====
Pacha Siku

In Andean music, the pentatonic scale is used substantially minor, sometimes major, and seldom in scale. In the most ancient genres of Andean music being performed without string instruments (only with winds and percussion), pentatonic melody is often led with parallel fifths and fourths, so formally this music is hexatonic.

==== Jazz ====
Rock guitar solo almost all over B minor pentatonic

Jazz music commonly uses both the major and the minor pentatonic scales. Pentatonic scales are useful for improvisers in modern jazz, pop, and rock contexts because they work well over several chords diatonic to the same key, often better than the parent scale. For example, the blues scale is predominantly derived from the minor pentatonic scale, a very popular scale for improvisation in the realms of blues and rock alike. For instance, over a C major triad (C, E, G) in the key of C major, the note F can be perceived as dissonant as it is a half step above the major third (E) of the chord. It is for this reason commonly avoided. Using the major pentatonic scale is an easy way out of this problem. The scale tones 1, 2, 3, 5, 6 (from the major pentatonic) are either major triad tones (1, 3, 5) or common consonant extensions (2, 6) of major triads. For the corresponding relative minor pentatonic, scale tones 1, ♭3, 4, 5, ♭7 work the same way, either as minor triad tones (1, ♭3, 5) or as common extensions (4, ♭7), as they all avoid being a half step from a chord tone.

==== Other ====
Blackfoot music most often uses anhemitonic tetratonic or pentatonic scales.

U.S. military cadences, or jodies, which keep soldiers in step while marching or running, also typically use pentatonic scales.

Hymns and other religious music sometimes use the pentatonic scale; for example, the melody of the hymn "Amazing Grace."

The common pentatonic major and minor scales (C-D-E-G-A and C-E♭-F-G-B♭, respectively) are useful in modal composing, as both scales allow a melody to be modally ambiguous between their respective major (Ionian, Lydian, Mixolydian) and minor (Aeolian, Phrygian, Dorian) modes (Locrian excluded). With either modal or non-modal writing, however, the harmonization of a pentatonic melody does not necessarily have to be derived from only the pentatonic pitches.

Most Tuareg songs are pentatonic, as is most other music from the Sahel and Sudan regions.

== Role in education ==
The pentatonic scale plays a significant role in music education, particularly in Orff-based, Kodály-based, and Waldorf methodologies at the primary or elementary level.

The Orff system places a heavy emphasis on developing creativity through improvisation in children, largely through use of the pentatonic scale. Orff instruments, such as xylophones, bells and other metallophones, use wooden bars, metal bars or bells, which can be removed by the teacher, leaving only those corresponding to the pentatonic scale, which Carl Orff himself believed to be children's native tonality.

Children begin improvising using only these bars, and over time, more bars are added at the teacher's discretion until the complete diatonic scale is being used. Orff believed that the use of the pentatonic scale at such a young age was appropriate to the development of each child, since the nature of the scale meant that it was impossible for the child to make any real harmonic mistakes.

In Waldorf education, pentatonic music is considered to be appropriate for young children due to its simplicity and unselfconscious openness of expression. Pentatonic music centered on intervals of the fifth is often sung and played in early childhood; progressively smaller intervals are emphasized within primarily pentatonic as children progress through the early school years. At around nine years of age the music begins to center on first folk music using a six-tone scale, and then the modern diatonic scales, with the goal of reflecting the children's developmental progress in their musical experience. Pentatonic instruments used include lyres, pentatonic flutes, and tone bars; special instruments have been designed and built for the Waldorf curriculum.

== See also ==
- Jazz scale – Any musical scale used in jazz
- Quartal and quintal harmony – Types of harmonic structures in music
- Raga – Melodic mode of improvisation in Indian music
- Suspended chord – Musical chord in which the (major or minor) third is omitted
- Traditional sub-Saharan African harmony – Music theory of harmony
