= List of cultural and regional genres of music =

Many musical genres are particular to some geographical region or to an ethnic, religious or linguistic group.

== Cultural genres ==
=== By ethnicity or origin ===
- Ainu
- Indigenous Australian
- Maori
- Palestinian
- Russian
- Ukrainian

==== Immigrant communities ====
- African American
- African Caribbean
- Afro-Latino
- Anglo-American
- White Australian
- Cajun and Louisiana Creole
- Caribbean-British
- Immigrants to Australia
- Immigrants to the United States
- Indian-British
- Indo-Caribbean
- Irish- and Scottish-Canadian
- Irish- and Scottish-American
- Latino-American
- Tex-Mex and Tejano

==== International ethnic groups ====
- Afro-American (also Afro-Latin and Afro-Caribbean)
- Andean
- Arabic
- Assyrian
- Basque
- Bedouin
- Berber
- Celtic
- Garifuna
- Korean
- Kurdish
- Jewish
  - Secular
  - Sephardic
- Lao
- Maroon
- Native American and First Nations
- Nordic
- Romani
- Sami

==== Native Sub-Saharan African ethnic groups ====
- Baganda
- Ewe
- Hausa
- Igbo
- Ndebele
- Pygmy
- Shona
- Sotho
- Swazi
- Tswana
- Wolof
- Xhosa
- Yoruba
- Zulu

==== Native American ethnic groups ====
- Arapaho
- Blackfoot
- Dene
- Iroquois
- Innu
- Inuit
- Kiowa
- Kwakiutl
- Maya
- Navajo
- Pueblo (Hopi, Zuni)
- Seminole
- Sioux (Lakota, Dakota)
- Yaqui
- Yuman

=== By religion ===
- Buddhism
- Christianity
  - Anglicanism and Episcopalianism
  - Amish
  - Latter-Day Saints
  - Orthodox
    - Greek Orthodox
  - Salvation Army
  - Shakers
- Hare Krishna
- Hinduism
- Judaism
- Yarsanism
- Islam
- Native American religion
- Neopaganism
- Rastafari movement
- Shinto
- Sikhism
- Taoism
- Zoroastrianism
- See also: Music of Vatican City

=== By language ===
- Esperanto
- Portuguese

== Geographic genres ==
=== By country ===
- Afghanistan
- Albania
- Algeria
- Andorra
- Angola
- Antigua and Barbuda
- Argentina
- Armenia
- Australia
- Austria
- Azerbaijan
- Bahamas
- Bahrain
- Bangladesh
- Barbados
- Belarus
- Belgium
- Belize
- Benin
- Bhutan
- Bolivia
- Bosnia and Herzegovina
- Botswana
- Brazil
- Brunei
- Bulgaria
- Burkina Faso
- Cambodia
- Cameroon
- Canada
- Cape Verde
- Central African Republic
- Chad
- Chile
- China
- Colombia
- Comoros
- Congo-Kinshasa
- Congo-Brazzaville
- Costa Rica
- Côte d'Ivoire
- Croatia
- Cuba
- Cyprus
- Czech Republic
- Denmark
- Djibouti
- Dominica
- Dominican Republic
- Ecuador
- Egypt
- El Salvador
- Equatorial Guinea
- Eritrea
- Estonia
- Ethiopia
- Fiji
- Finland
- France
- Gabon
- Gambia
- Georgia
- Germany
- Ghana
- Greece
- Grenada
- Guatemala
- Guinea
- Guinea-Bissau
- Guyana
- Haiti
- Honduras
- Hong Kong
- Hungary
- Iceland
- India
- Indonesia
- Iran
- Iraq
- Ireland
- Israel
- Italy
- Jamaica
- Japan
- Jordan
- Kazakhstan
- Kenya
- Kiribati
- Kosovo
- Kuwait
- Kyrgyzstan
- Laos
- Latvia
- Lebanon
- Lesotho
- Liberia
- Libya
- Liechtenstein
- Lithuania
- Luxembourg
- Macedonia
- Madagascar
- Malawi
- Malaysia
- Maldives
- Mali
- Malta
- Marshall Islands
- Mauritania
- Mauritius
- Mexico
- Federated States of Micronesia
- Moldova
- Monaco
- Mongolia
- Montenegro
- Morocco
- Mozambique
- Myanmar
- Namibia
- Nauru
- Nepal
- Netherlands
- New Zealand
- Nicaragua
- Niger
- Nigeria
- North Korea
- Norway
- Oman
- Pakistan
- Palau
- Palestine
- Panama
- Papua New Guinea
- Paraguay
- Peru
- Philippines
- Poland
- Portugal
- Qatar
- Romania
- Russia
- Rwanda
- Saint Kitts and Nevis
- Saint Lucia
- Saint Vincent and the Grenadines
- Samoa
- San Marino
- São Tomé and Príncipe
- Saudi Arabia
- Senegal
- Serbia
- Seychelles
- Sierra Leone
- Singapore
- Slovakia
- Slovenia
- Solomon Islands
- Somalia
- South Africa
- South Korea
- Spain
- Sri Lanka
- Sudan
- Suriname
- Swaziland
- Sweden
- Switzerland
- Syria
- Taiwan
- Tajikistan
- Tanzania
- Thailand
- Timor-Leste
- Togo
- Tonga
- Trinidad and Tobago
- Tunisia
- Turkey
- Turkmenistan
- Tuvalu
- Uganda
- Ukraine
- United Arab Emirates
- United Kingdom
- United States
- Uruguay
- Uzbekistan
- Vanuatu
- Vatican City
- Venezuela
- Vietnam
- Western Sahara
- Yemen
- Zambia
- Zimbabwe

=== By continent or other international region ===
- Africa
  - North Africa
  - Sub-Saharan Africa
  - West Africa
- Asia
  - Central Asia
  - East Asia
  - South Asia
  - Southeast Asia
- Caribbean
  - Lesser Antilles
- Central America
- Europe
  - Low Countries
  - Northern Europe
  - Southeastern Europe
- Middle East
- North America
- Oceania and Australia
  - Melanesia
  - Micronesia
  - Polynesia
- South America

=== By province, region or other sub-national entity ===
==== Algeria ====
- Kabylie

==== Australia ====
- Adelaide
- Brisbane
- Canberra
- Perth
- Sydney

==== Austria ====
- Innsbruck
- Vienna

==== Bulgaria ====
- Thrace

==== Canada ====
Cities:

- Montreal
- Vancouver

Regions:

- Maritime Provinces
- Prairie Provinces
- West

Provinces and Territories:

- Alberta
- British Columbia
- Manitoba
- New Brunswick
- Newfoundland and Labrador
- Northwest Territories
- Nova Scotia
- Nunavut
- Ontario
- Prince Edward Island
- Quebec
- Saskatchewan
- Yukon

==== Chile ====
- Easter Island

==== China ====
- Anhui
- Fujian
- Gansu
- Guangdong
- Guangxi
- Guizhou
- Hebei
- Heilongjiang
- Henan
- Hong Kong
- Hubei
- Inner Mongolia
- Jiangxi
- Jilin
- Macau
- Manchuria
- Qinghai
- Shaanxi
- Sichuan
- Tibet
- Xinjiang
- Yunnan

==== Denmark ====
Overseas:

- Faroe Islands
- Greenland

==== Finland ====
- Åland
- Karelia

==== France ====
Cities

- Monaco
- Paris

Regions

- Aquitaine
- Auvergne
- Brittany
- Burgundy
- Corsica
- Gascony
- Limousin

Overseas:

- Austral Islands
- French Guiana
- French Polynesia
- Martinique and Guadeloupe
- Mayotte
- New Caledonia
- Réunion
- Tahiti
- Wallis and Futuna

==== Germany ====
Cities

- Berlin

==== Greece ====
- Aegean Islands
- Crete
- Cyclades
- Dodecanese Islands
- Epirus
- Ionian Islands
- Lesbos
- Macedonia
- Peloponnesos
- Thessaloniki
- Thessaly
- Thrace

==== Hungary ====
- Budapest
- Pécs

==== India ====
- Andaman and Nicobar Islands
- Andhra Pradesh
- Arunachal Pradesh
- Assam
- Bengal
- Bihar
- Chhattisgarh
- Goa
- Gujarat
- Haryana
- Himachal Pradesh
- Jammu
- Jharkhand
- Karnataka
- Kashmir
- Kerala
- Madhya Pradesh
- Maharashtra
- Manipur
- Meghalaya
- Mizoram
- Nagaland
- Orissa
- Punjab
- Rajasthan
- Sikkim
- Tamil Nadu
- Tripura
- Uttar Pradesh
- Uttaranchal

==== Indonesia ====
- Bali
- Java
- Sumatra
- Sunda

==== Israel ====
- Mizrahi Music

==== Italy ====
Regions:

- Aosta Valley
- Calabria
- Campania
- Friuli
- Latium
- Liguria
- Lombardy
- Marche
- Piedmont
- Puglia
- Sardinia
- Sicily
- Trentino-Alto Adige/Südtirol
- Tuscany
- Veneto

Cities:

- Florence
- Genoa
- Lucca
- Milan
- Naples
- Venice

==== Japan ====
- Okinawa

==== Mexico ====
- Chihuahua

==== Netherlands ====
Overseas:

- Aruba and the Netherlands Antilles

==== New Zealand ====
Overseas:

- Cook Islands
- Niue
- Tokelau

==== Portugal ====
- Madeira

==== Romania ====
- Transylvania

==== Russia ====
Cities:

- Kaliningrad
- Rostov-on-Don

Regions:

- Adygea
- Altai
- Astrakhan
- Bashkortostan
- Buryatia
- Dagestan
- Evenkia
- Ingushetia
- Irkutsk
- Kaliningrad
- Kalmykia
- Karelia
- Khakassia
- Mordovia
- Nenetsia
- Ossetia
- Sakha
- Tatarstan
- Tuva
- Udmurtia

==== Serbia ====
- Vojvodina

==== Spain ====
- Andalusia
- Aragon
- Balearic Islands
- Basque Country
- Canary Islands
- Castile, Madrid and Leon
- Catalonia
- Extremadura
- Galicia, Cantabria and Asturias
- Madrid
- Murcia
- Navarre and La Rioja
- Valencia

==== Taiwan ====
- Taiwan

==== Tajikistan ====
- Badakhshan

==== Turkey ====
- Thrace
- Karadeniz

==== United Kingdom ====
Individual countries

- England
  - Cornwall
  - Northumbria
  - Somerset
- Northern Ireland
- Scotland
- Wales

Cities:

- Birmingham
  - Classical music of Birmingham
  - Jazz of Birmingham
  - Popular music of Birmingham
- Cardiff
- Liverpool
- Manchester

Dependencies and Territories:

- Anguilla
- Bermuda
- Cayman Islands
- Channel Islands
- Falkland Islands
- Gibraltar
- Isle of Man
- Montserrat
- Saint Helena
- Turks and Caicos Islands
- Virgin Islands

==== United States ====
Regions:

- Appalachia
- Mid-Atlantic
- West

Cities:

- Annapolis
- Athens
- Atlanta
- Austin
- Baltimore
- Charlotte
- Chicago
- Dallas
- Denver
- Detroit
- Fort Worth
- Los Angeles
- Miami
- Milwaukee
- New Orleans
- New York City
- Olympia
- Omaha
- Philadelphia
- San Diego
- San Francisco
- Seattle
- Washington, D.C.

States:

- Alabama
- Alaska
- Arizona
- Arkansas
- California
- Colorado
- Connecticut
- Delaware
- Florida
- Georgia
- Hawaii
- Idaho
- Illinois
- Indiana
- Iowa
- Kansas
- Kentucky
- Louisiana
- Maine
- Maryland
- Massachusetts
- Michigan
- Minnesota
- Mississippi
- Missouri
- Montana
- Nebraska
- Nevada
- New Hampshire
- New Jersey
- New Mexico
- New York
- North Carolina
- North Dakota
- Ohio
- Oklahoma
- Oregon
- Pennsylvania
- Rhode Island
- South Carolina
- South Dakota
- Tennessee
- Texas
- Utah
- Vermont
- Virginia
- Washington
- West Virginia
- Wisconsin
- Wyoming

Overseas:

- American Samoa
- Guam
- Mariana Islands
- Puerto Rico
- Virgin Islands

== Historical genres ==
- Byzantine
- Early
- Ancient Celtic
- Ancient Egypt
- Ancient Greek
- Ancient India
- Hittite
- Maya
- Hayran
- Medieval (Europe)
- Mesopotamia
- Ottoman
- Ancient Persia
- Prehistoric
- Renaissance (Europe)
- Ancient Rome
- Sasanian Empire
- Soviet Union
- Ancient Sumeria
- Temperance songs
- Ancient Tamil

== See also ==
- List of basic music topics
- Lists by country
- List of national anthems
- List of folk music traditions
