= Outline of music =

Form of art using sound

The following outline is provided as an overview of and topical guide to music:

Music – human expression often in the medium of time using the structures of sounds or tones and silence. It may be expressed in terms of pitch, rhythm, harmony, and timbre.

== Definition of music ==
- Definition of music
  - One of the arts
  - One of the performing arts
  - One of the humanities
  - An academic discipline

== History of music ==
History of music

- Timeline of musical events
  - Prehistoric music
  - Ancient music
    - Music in ancient India
    - Music of Mesopotamia
    - Music of ancient Greece
    - Music of ancient Rome
- Art music
  - Andalusian classical music
  - Arab classical music
  - Chinese classical music
  - Indian classical music
    - Carnatic music
    - Hindustani classical music
  - Persian traditional music
    - Sasanian music
- Western classical music
- Dates of classical music eras
  - Early music period
    - European medieval music
      - Saint Gall
      - Saint Martial
      - Goliard
      - Ars antiqua
        - Notre-Dame school
      - Troubadour
      - Trouvère
      - Minnesang
      - Ars nova
      - Trecento
      - Ars subtilior
    - Renaissance music
  - Common practice period
    - Baroque music
      - the galant music period
    - Classical period
    - Romantic music
  - 20th-century classical music
    - Impressionism
    - Expressionist
    - Modernism
    - Neoclassicism
    - Experimental music
    - Postmodern music
    - Contemporary classical music
  - 21st-century classical music

=== By region or ethnicity ===
- Timeline of trends in Australian music
- Byzantine music
- Timeline of Chinese music
- Timeline of Italian music
- Timeline of music in the United States
- History of music in the biblical period

== Musical ensembles ==
Musical ensemble

- Band
  - Band (rock and pop)
  - Brass band
  - Concert band
  - Fanfare band
  - Jazz band
    - Big band
  - Marching band
  - Military band
    - Ottoman military band
  - One-man band
  - Pipe band
- Camerata
- Chapel
- Choir
  - Flute choir
  - Men's chorus
  - Singakademie
- Decet
- Duet
  - Piano duet
- Duodecet
- Gamelan
- Nonet
- Octet
  - String octet
- Orchestra
  - Pit orchestra
  - String orchestra
- Percussion ensemble
- Quartet
  - Flute quartet
  - Piano quartet
  - Saxophone quartet
  - String quartet
  - Wind quartet
  - Woodwind quartet
- Quintet
  - Brass quintet
  - Clarinet quintet
  - Pierrot ensemble
  - String quintet
  - Wind quintet
- Septet
- Sextet
  - Piano sextet
  - String sextet
- Sinfonietta
- Trio
  - Clarinet trio
  - Jazz trio
    - Organ trio
  - Piano trio
  - String trio

== Genres of music ==
- Blues
- Classical
- Country
- Electronic
  - Electronic dance
- Electronica
- Folk
- Funk
- Gospel
- Grunge
- Hip hop
- Jazz
  - Avant-garde jazz
  - Chamber jazz
  - Free jazz
  - Latin jazz
  - Orchestral jazz
- Latin
  - Latin ballad
- Martial music
- Pop
  - Dance-pop
  - Electropop
- Reggae
- Rhythm and blues
- Rock
  - Heavy metal
  - Progressive rock
  - Psychedelic rock
  - Punk rock
- Ska
- Theatre music
  - Ballet
  - Opera
  - Musical theatre
    - Incidental music

=== Music by region ===
Cultural and regional genres of music

Africa

West Africa

Benin • Burkina Faso • Cape Verde • Côte d'Ivoire • Gambia • Ghana • Guinea • Guinea-Bissau • Liberia • Mali • Mauritania • Niger • Nigeria • Senegal • Sierra Leone • Togo

North Africa

Algeria • Egypt • Libya • Mauritania • Morocco • Sudan • South Sudan • Tunisia • Western Sahara

Central Africa

Angola • Burundi • Cameroon • Central African Republic • Chad • The Democratic Republic of the Congo • Equatorial Guinea • Gabon • Republic of the Congo • Rwanda • São Tomé and Príncipe

East Africa

Burundi • Comoros • Djibouti • Eritrea • Ethiopia • Kenya • Madagascar • Malawi • Mauritius • Mozambique • Rwanda • Seychelles • Somalia • Tanzania • Uganda • Zambia • Zimbabwe

Southern Africa

Botswana • Lesotho • Namibia • South Africa • Eswatini

Dependencies

Mayotte (France) • St. Helena (UK) • Puntland • Somaliland • Sahrawi Arab Democratic Republic

Asia

Central Asia

Kazakhstan • Kyrgyzstan • Tajikistan • Turkmenistan • Uzbekistan

East Asia
China • Tibet • Hong Kong • Macau • Japan • North Korea • South Korea • Mongolia • Taiwan
North Asia

Russia

Southeast Asia

Brunei • Burma (Myanmar) • Cambodia • Indonesia • Laos • Malaysia • Philippines (Metro Manila) • Singapore • Thailand • Timor-Leste • Vietnam

South Asia

Afghanistan • Bangladesh • Bhutan • Maldives • Nepal • Pakistan • Sri Lanka
India

States of India: Andhra Pradesh • Arunachal Pradesh • Assam • Bihar • Chhattisgarh • Goa • Gujarat • Haryana • Himachal Pradesh • Jammu and Kashmir • Jharkhand • Karnataka • Kerala • Madhya Pradesh • Maharashtra • Manipur • Meghalaya • Mizoram • Nagaland • Odisha • Punjab • Rajasthan • Sikkim • Tamil Nadu • Telangana • Tripura • Uttar Pradesh • Uttarakhand • West Bengal

West Asia

Armenia • Azerbaijan • Bahrain • Cyprus (including disputed Northern Cyprus) • Georgia • Iran • Iraq • Israel • Jordan • Kuwait • Lebanon • Oman • State of Palestine • Qatar • Saudi Arabia • Syria • Turkey • United Arab Emirates • Yemen

Caucasus (a region considered to be in both Asia and Europe, or between them)

North Caucasus

Parts of Russia (Chechnya, Ingushetia, Dagestan, Adyghea, Kabardino-Balkaria, Karachai-Cherkessia, North Ossetia, Krasnodar Krai, Stavropol Krai)

South Caucasus

Georgia (including disputed Abkhazia, South Ossetia) • Armenia • Azerbaijan (including disputed Nagorno-Karabakh Republic)

Europe

Akrotiri and Dhekelia • Åland • Albania • Andorra • Armenia • Austria • Azerbaijan • Belarus • Belgium • Bosnia and Herzegovina • Bulgaria • Croatia • Cyprus • Czech Republic • Denmark • Estonia • Faroe Islands • Finland • France • Georgia • Germany • Gibraltar • Greece • Guernsey • Hungary • Iceland • Ireland • Isle of Man • Italy (Rome) • Jersey • Kazakhstan • Kosovo • Latvia • Liechtenstein • Lithuania • Luxembourg • Macedonia • Malta • Moldova (including disputed Transnistria) • Monaco • Montenegro • Netherlands • Poland • Portugal • Romania • Russia • San Marino • Serbia • Slovakia • Slovenia •
Norway

Svalbard

Spain

Autonomous communities of Spain: Catalonia

Sweden • Switzerland • Turkey • Ukraine
United Kingdom

England (Cornwall, London, Sussex) • Northern Ireland • Scotland • Wales (Cardiff, Newport)

Vatican City

European Union

North America

Canada

Provinces of Canada: • Alberta • British Columbia (Vancouver) • Manitoba • New Brunswick • Newfoundland and Labrador • Nova Scotia • Ontario • Prince Edward Island • Quebec • Saskatchewan
Territories of Canada: Northwest Territories • Nunavut • Yukon

Greenland • Saint Pierre and Miquelon

United States

Alabama • Alaska • Arizona (Tucson) • Arkansas • California (Los Angeles) • Colorado Denver • Connecticut • Delaware • Florida • Georgia (Athens, Atlanta) • Hawaii • Idaho • Illinois (Chicago) • Indiana • Iowa • Kansas • Kentucky • Louisiana • Maine • Maryland (Annapolis, Baltimore) • Massachusetts • Michigan (Detroit) • Minnesota • Mississippi • Missouri • Montana • Nebraska • Nevada • New Hampshire • New Jersey • New Mexico • New York (New York City) • North Carolina • North Dakota • Ohio • Oklahoma • Oregon • Pennsylvania (Philadelphia) • Rhode Island • South Carolina • South Dakota • Tennessee • Texas Austin • Utah • Vermont • Virginia • Washington (Olympia, Seattle) • West Virginia • Wisconsin • Wyoming

Washington, D.C.

Mexico

Central America

Belize • Costa Rica • El Salvador • Guatemala • Honduras • Nicaragua • Panama

Caribbean

Anguilla • Antigua and Barbuda • Aruba • Bahamas • Barbados • Bermuda • British Virgin Islands • Cayman Islands • Cuba • Dominica • Dominican Republic • Grenada • Haiti • Jamaica • Montserrat • Netherlands Antilles • Puerto Rico • Saint Barthélemy • Saint Kitts and Nevis • Saint Lucia • Saint Martin • Saint Vincent and the Grenadines • Trinidad and Tobago • Turks and Caicos Islands • United States Virgin Islands

Oceania (includes the continent of Australia)

Australasia

Australia

(Adelaide, Perth, Sydney)
Dependencies/Territories of Australia

Christmas Island • Cocos (Keeling) Islands • Norfolk Island

New Zealand

Melanesia

Fiji • Indonesia (Oceanian part only) • New Caledonia (France) • Papua New Guinea • Solomon Islands • Vanuatu •

Micronesia

Federated States of Micronesia • Guam (USA) • Kiribati • Marshall Islands • Nauru • Northern Mariana Islands (USA) • Palau • Wake Island (USA) •

Polynesia

American Samoa (USA) • Chatham Islands (NZ) • Cook Islands (NZ) • Easter Island (Chile) • French Polynesia (France) • Hawaii (USA) • Loyalty Islands (France) • Niue (NZ) • Pitcairn Islands (UK) • Adamstown • Samoa • Tokelau (NZ) • Tonga • Tuvalu • Wallis and Futuna (France)

South America

Argentina • Bolivia • Brazil • Chile • Colombia • Ecuador • Falkland Islands • Guyana • Paraguay • Peru • Suriname • Uruguay • Venezuela

South Atlantic

Ascension Island • Saint Helena • Tristan da Cunha

== Musical compositions ==
Musical composition

=== Types of musical pieces and compositions ===
Musical form

==== Single-movement forms ====
- Strophic form (AA...)
- Binary form (AB)
- Ternary form less often tertiary (ABA)
- Arch form (ABCBA)

==== Multi-movement forms ====
- Ballet
- Cantata
- Chorale
- Concerto
- Dance
- Etude
- Fantasia
- Fugue
- Mass
- Opera
- Oratorio
- Prelude
- Requiem
- Rhapsody
- Sonata
- Suite
- Symphonic poem
- Symphony

=== Sections of a piece or composition ===
Section (music)

- Introduction
- Exposition
- Recapitulation
- Verse
- Refrain (chorus)
- Bridge
- Interlude
- Guitar solo
- Conclusion
- Coda
- Fadeout

=== Musical notation ===
Musical notation

- Staff
  - Clefs
  - Key signature
    - Key
  - Time signature
    - Beats
  - Bars (Measures)
  - Ledger lines
- Grand staff
- Notes
  - Note values
  - Dotted notes
  - Ties
- Accidentals
  - Tempo
  - Dynamics
- Lyrics (included on vocal music)
- Modern musical symbols
- Score (for ensembles)
- Sheet music

==== Variations of musical notation ====
- Percussion notation
- Figured bass
- Lead sheets
- Chord charts
  - Shape note system

== Musical techniques ==
- Bell chord
- Broken chords
  - Arpeggio
    - Bass arpeggiation
    - Non-harmonic arpeggio
- Ostinato
- Tremolo
- Guitar performance techniques

== Musical skills and procedures ==
- Absolute pitch
- Ear training
- Fingering
- Learning music by ear
- Modulation
- Numerical sight-singing
- Practice
- Relative pitch
- Sight reading
- "Swinging"
- Transposition
- Tuning
- Virtuosity

=== Vocal ranges ===
- Vocal range

==== Female ranges ====
- Soprano
- Mezzo-soprano
- Contralto

==== Male ranges ====
- Boy soprano
- Sopranist
- Alto
- Tenor
- Baritone
- Bass-baritone
- Bass

== Musical instruments ==
Musical instrument (List of musical instruments)

- Wind instruments
- Percussion instruments
- String instruments
- Voice
- Electronic instruments
- Keyboard instruments
  - Musical keyboard

See also the List of musical instruments by Hornbostel–Sachs number

== Music technology ==
Music technology

- Electric music technology
- Electronic and digital music technology
- Mechanical music technology
- List of music software

== Music industry ==
Music industry

- Album
- Compact disc (CD)
- Compact Cassette
- Concert
- Concert tour
- Grammy Awards
- Music recording sales certification
- Performance
- Music videos
- Record
- Record industry
- Recording studio
- Single

=== Music industry participants ===
- A&R
- ASCAP
- Band manager
- Booking agent
- BMI
- Copyright collective
- Disc jockey
- MCPS
- Musician – person who writes, performs, or makes music. Musicians can be classified by their roles in creating or performing music.
  - Instrumentalist – one who plays a musical instrument.
    - Traditional instrumentalist – one who plays folk music on traditional instruments such as gongs.
    - Classical instrumentalist – one who plays classical music, usually with Western orchestral instruments such as the violin, flute etc.
    - Instrumentalists who plays popular music – one who plays with instruments in the big band, e.g. the electric guitar, drums, saxophone, trumpet, trombone etc.
  - Singer – a vocalist.
  - Composer – person who creates music, either by musical notation or oral tradition, for interpretation and performance, or through direct manipulation of sonic material through electronic media.
    - Songwriter
    - Arranger
  - Conductor – leads a musical ensemble. A conductor may simultaneously act as an instrumentalist in the ensemble.
  - Recording artist – creates recorded music, such as CDs and MP3 files.
- Musicians' Union
- Publisher
- PRS
- Record producer
- Record label
- Record distributor
- Tour promoter
- Road crew ("roadies")
- Performance rights organisation

== Music theory ==
Music theory

=== Elements of music ===
Elements of music

- Pitch
- Scale
- Mode
- Chord
- Dynamics (music)
- Articulation
- Texture
- Consonance and dissonance
- Expression
- Harmony
- Melody
- Musical form
- Notation
- Rhythm
- Timbre

== Musicology ==
Musicology

- Biomusicology
  - Evolutionary musicology
- Cognitive musicology
- Ethnomusicology
- Historical musicology
- Systematic musicology
  - Sociomusicology (music sociology)
  - Philosophy of music
  - Music acoustics (physics of music)
  - Computer sciences of music
    - Sound and music computing
    - Music information retrieval
    - Computing in musicology
- Zoomusicology

=== Music education ===
Music education

- Music lessons

== Music and politics ==
Music and politics

== Music organizations ==
- Musicians' Union (UK)
- Sony Music Entertainment
- International Music Council
- International Federation of the Phonographic Industry
- Australian Recording Industry Association

== Psychology of music ==
Psychology of music

- Cognitive musicology
- Cognitive neuroscience of music
- Culture in music cognition
- Music and emotion
- Music-specific disorders
- Music therapy
- Psychoacoustics
- Psychoanalysis and music
- Psychology of music preference

== See also ==
- Index of music articles
- Glossary of musical terminology
- Outline of the Beatles
- Outline of the Doors
