= Music in Khakassia =

Music of Russia: Central Asian music
Genres	Bards - Classical music - Hip hop - Jazz - Opera - Rock
Awards	MTV Russia Music Awards
Charts
Festivals	Bard Music Festival
Media
National anthem	"National anthem of Russia"
Music of Central Asia
Afghanistan - Badakhshan - Buryatia - Gansu - Inner Mongolia - Kazakhstan - Khakassia - Kyrgyzstan - Mongolia - Qinghai - Tajikistan - Tibet - Turkmenistan - Tuva - Uzbekistan - Xinjiang
Russian regions and ethnicities
Adygea - Altai - Astrakhan - Bashkortostan - Buryatia - Belarusian - Chechnya - Chukotka - Chuvashia - Dagestan - Evenkia - Ingushetia - Irkutsk - Kaliningrad - Kalmykia - Kamchatka - Karelia - Khakassia - Khantia-Mansia - Komi Republic - Krasnodar - Mari El - Mordovia - Nenetsia - Ossetia - Rostov - Russian Traditional - Sakha - Sakhalin - Tatarstan - Tyva - Udmurtia - Ukrainian

Khakassia is a region in Russia. The Khakas people are Turkic, and their culture, including music, has some similarities to the culture of Tuva, a neighboring region in Central Asia. Like Tuva, throat-singing is practiced in Khakassia, often accompanied by a two-stringed instrument called the khomys. A bridge zither called jadagan is also used.

The city of Abakan has hosted the International Khakass Folk Music Competition since 1995. Musicians include Anna Burnakova, Sergey Charkov, Slava Kuchenov, Aleksandr Samozhikov, Yevgeniy Ulugbashev. Folk music ensembles include Aylanys, Sabjilar, Ulgher, Khyrkhaas.
