= Music of Buryatia =

Music of Russia: Central Asian music
Genres	Bards - Classical music - Hip hop - Jazz - Opera - Rock
Awards	MTV Russia Music Awards
Charts
Festivals	Bard Music Festival
Media
National anthem	"National anthem of Russia"
Music of Central Asia
Afghanistan - Badakhshan - Buryatia - Gansu - Inner Mongolia - Kazakhstan - Khakassia - Kyrgyzstan - Mongolia - Qinghai - Tajikistan - Tibet - Turkmenistan - Tuva - Uzbekistan - Xinjiang
Russian regions and ethnicities
Adygea - Altai - Astrakhan - Bashkortostan - Buryatia - Belarusian - Chechnya - Chukotka - Chuvashia - Dagestan - Evenkia - Ingushetia - Irkutsk - Kaliningrad - Kalmykia - Kamchatka - Karelia - Khakassia - Khantia-Mansia - Komi Republic - Krasnodar - Mari El - Mordovia - Nenetsia - Ossetia - Rostov - Russian Traditional - Sakha - Sakhalin - Tatarstan - Tyva - Udmurtia - Ukrainian

Buryatia is a constituent republic of the Russian Federation. One of the region's principal musical instruments is the two‑stringed horse‑head fiddle known as the morin khuur, an instrument intimately associated with the deeply rooted cult of the horse and part of the intangible heritage of all Mongolic peoples. Other features of Buryat music—such as the use of fourths in both instrumental tuning and vocal melodies, and the prevalence of pentatonic scales—reveal close affinities with the musical traditions of Siberia and East Asia. There was traditionally no polyphony; voices and instruments performed the same melodic line in unison, but varied in timing and ornamentation.

Narrative structures, often in the form of epic tales and the last songs of celebrated leaders, lie at the heart of much Buryat folk music; an example is the Last Song of Rinchin Dorzhin.

Under Soviet rule, Buryat folk music was purged of elements deemed subversive and was largely permitted only in forms that reinforced the authority of the state. This era produced state‑approved songs commemorating events such as the Civil War and the Great Patriotic War.

The first Buryat rock band was Uragsha, one of the few groups of its time to perform in both Russian and the native Mongolian tongue. Their collaboration with the La MaMa theatre in New York City in the late 1990s led them to embrace traditional music and shamanic roots, and ultimately to the formation of the group Namgar, which has represented Buryat traditional music at world music festivals since 2001.

Vladlen Pantaev is another notable Buryat musician, widely regarded as one of the key composers of Buryat folk music. He devoted many years to the National Theatre in Ulan‑Ude, and many of his songs enjoy wide recognition throughout the region.

== See also ==
- Anatoliy Andreyev – Buryat composer of popular and classical music
- Namgar is a band performing traditional Buryat and Mongolian music
- Buryat National Opera
