= French music =

French music may refer to:

- Music of France, music of the French people in France

French music may also refer to the music of French-speaking countries:

- Music of Quebec, music of the French-Canadians in Canada, most often Québécois or Acadians
- Music of Belgium
- Music of Switzerland
- Music of Monaco
- Music of Luxembourg

French styles of music may refer to:

- French classical music
- French opera
- French folk music
- French popular music
- French pop music
- French jazz
- French electronic music
- French house music
- French rock
- Chanson
- Nouvelle Chanson
- Bal-musette
- Cabaret
- Yéyé
