= Caledonian hip-hop =

Caledonian hip hop may refer to

- New Caledonian hip-hop
- Scottish hip-hop
