= Amyrga =

Musical instrument

The amyrga (Tuvan: амырга) is a horn in Tuvan culture originally used as a hunting horn for hunting stags, but is also used in Tuvan music as a musical instrument, such as by Huun-Huur-Tu.

== Usage ==
The amyrga comes in a conic shape, with the user tightening lips around the narrower end and inhaling to produce a series of overtones that imitate the call of male Siberian red deer during the fall mating season.

== See also ==
- Music of Tuva
- Tuvan throat singing
