= Great Northern Arts Festival =

The Great Northern Arts Festival is held each year in Inuvik, Northwest Territories. Lasting approximately ten days, it is an annual event held each summer. It was established in 1989 by Charlene Alexander and Sue Rose. While the festival's mandate is to serve Northern artists and craftspeople, artists from around the world also attend. The festival is designed as a venue for artists to see each other's work and to experiment with new applications. It includes arts of all types, such as fiber art and Music of the Northwest Territories. Artists partake in demonstrations, masterclasses, seminars, and workshops. The festival's gallery offers pieces for sale. There are cultural presentations each evening which include concerts, dance, fashion, music, and storytelling. Media coverage brings festival highlights to viewing audiences.
