= Music of immigrant communities in Australia =

Australia is home to several large immigrant communities from every continent in the world.

== Indonesian ==
Gamelan has been part of the music of Sydney since at least 1985, when gamelan instruments were purchased by the Centre for Performance Studies at the University of Sydney and the Australian Museum. The Sydney University Gamelan Society was founded the following year; this was followed by a student group in 1992, Kyai Kebo Giro.

== Vietnamese ==
Vietnamese-Australian music includes tân nhạc, a form of popular music that has been part of the music of Vietnam since the late 1930s. Elements of the vocal style, such as the use of vibratos and bent tones, are common Vietnamese techniques, while Western meter, rhythms, tonal harmony, temperament and song form (ABA) are also used. Ensembles are generally made up of electric guitars, keyboards and a drum kit. Rhythms often used Latin or European dance rhythms like the tango, cha cha cha, waltz or bolero. In addition to ordinary Western pop and rock, Vietnamese-Australian popular music includes the Quê hương style which often uses more traditional Vietnamese elements like the pentatonic scale, call-and-response and pieces of folk songs. The Tân cổ giao duyên is a song style that developed in Saigon in 1964, developed by Bảy Bá. It was a combination of Western popular music and a traditional song Vọng cổ.

Vietnamese Australians hold large variety shows called đại nhạc hội, which are an important part of the ethnic music scene. Vietnamese-American performers sometimes attend. There are also Vietnamese chamber choirs, such as Hương Xưa and Ðàn Chim Việt in Melbourne.

Vietnamese Australian folk music includes both traditional Vietnamese styles as well as Anglo-Celtic style folk music, and, very often, a mixture of the two. Vietnamese chamber music, in two styles, nhạc Huế and đờn ca tài tử, Buddhist chants and sung poetry, Ngâm thơ are performed in the Vietnamese community. The cải lương is an important Vietnamese Australian tradition; it is a form of theatre that is performed at various holidays and celebrations.

The Vietnamese-Australian community has produced a number of composers who experiment with mixtures of Vietnamese and Western elements. These include Lê Thị Kim, Hoàng Ngọc Tuấn, Ðặng Kim Hiền and Lê Tuấn Hùng; others, like Bamboo Ochre and Nguyễn Anh Dũng, use elements of jazz in their work.
