= Music of Piedmont =

The Piedmont has played an important role in the development of music, in general, in Italy, due to the presence of medieval monasteries in that area, institutions that were great preservers of manuscripts in the Middle Ages as well as being geographically well located to connect to musical influences from northern Europe. As well, the political dominance of the Royal House of Savoy leading up to its eventual installation as the ruling dynasty of united Italy was important.

Musically, the Teatro Regio in Turin was one of the fine, old opera houses in Europe, stemming from the 1730s. Also from that period is the Teatro Carignano, which in the late 19th century was the venue for some of the early works of Giacomo Puccini. Turin was actually the first capital of Italy, but with the final unification of the nation in 1861, that function, has been assumed by Rome. Various facets of cultural life, thus, went through a certain period of "downsizing" in the late 19th century. In the early 20th century, however, Arturo Toscanini became the conductor of the municipal symphony and the musical life of the city was rejuvenated. A radio symphony was formed in the 1930s and now, Turin is the seat of the National Symphony Orchestra.

Music theaters and auditoriums in Turin include the Teatro Regio (rebuilt in 1973), the Lingotto or the Gianni Agnelli auditorium (opened in 1994 on the premises of an ex-Fiat factory), the new RAI auditorium (home of the national symphony), the Circolo degli Artisti, (where Toscanini broke in at age 22 as a cellist), and the premises of the Giuseppe Verdi conservatory. The city hosts an annual music festival called Torino Settembre Musica.

As one moves to other provinces in Piedmont, prominent venues and activities include:

- the Teatro Comunale in Alessandria;
- the Teatro Civico in Tortona;
- the Teatro Alfieri in Asti;
- the monastery of Bose in Magnano, dedicated to contemporary music;
- the Bartolomeo Bruni orchestra in Cuneo;
- the Stresa music festival, held on Isola Bella on Lake Maggiore;
- the Umberto Giordano Festival in Baveno.
