= Music of Milan =

The music of Milan has ancient roots. The Ambrosian chants are among the first codified music in Western culture, which fact led to the later development of its concept of scales, for example. In more recent history, the city of Milan has been an important social, cultural, political and commercial center not just in Italy, but in all of Europe.

== Venues ==
- La Scala: by general consensus the leading opera house in Italy, was built in 1778 and refurbished and reopened in 2004;
- Milan Auditorium: opened in 1999, it is the home of the Orchestra Sinfonica di Milano Giuseppe Verdi. The orchestra is the symphony for the city, having replaced the older RAI Orchestra of Milan, which was one of four such radio orchestras in Italy until they were consolidated into a single organization, now called the National Orchestra, in Turin;
- Milan Conservatory, on the premises of an ancient monastery, was rebuilt after WW2. It has a large auditorium and hosts a number of concert series, including those of the Società del quartetto di Milano, the United Chamber Orchestra, the Italian Youth music series, and sundry afternoon and evening concerts;
- At least a dozen other theatres throughout the city, including the Teatro Dal Verme, Teatro degli Arcimboldi, Teatro Lirico, Teatro Carcano, and Piccolo Teatro;
- Casa di Riposo per Musicisti, unique in Italy and rare in the world, a retirement Place built with royalties from Verdi's works. It finally opened in 1913 and since that time has provided a place for retired musicians. Those who live there still play and sing for their own enjoyment and, occasionally, for visitors;
- Milan Jazz Festival: one of the most important European venues for jazz;

== Museums ==
- The Museo Teatrale alla Scala is a museum devoted to theatrical and musical history with a particular emphasis on opera and on the Teatro della Scala to which it is attached.
- The Museum of Musical Instruments houses collections of musical instruments of historical and ethnographical importance.
