= Music of Guizhou =

Guizhou is a province of China. Their folk tradition includes the song "Red Flower", which spread across China in the 1950s. The song came from the Buyi people. The Shui people use instruments like the lusheng, bronze drums and horns.

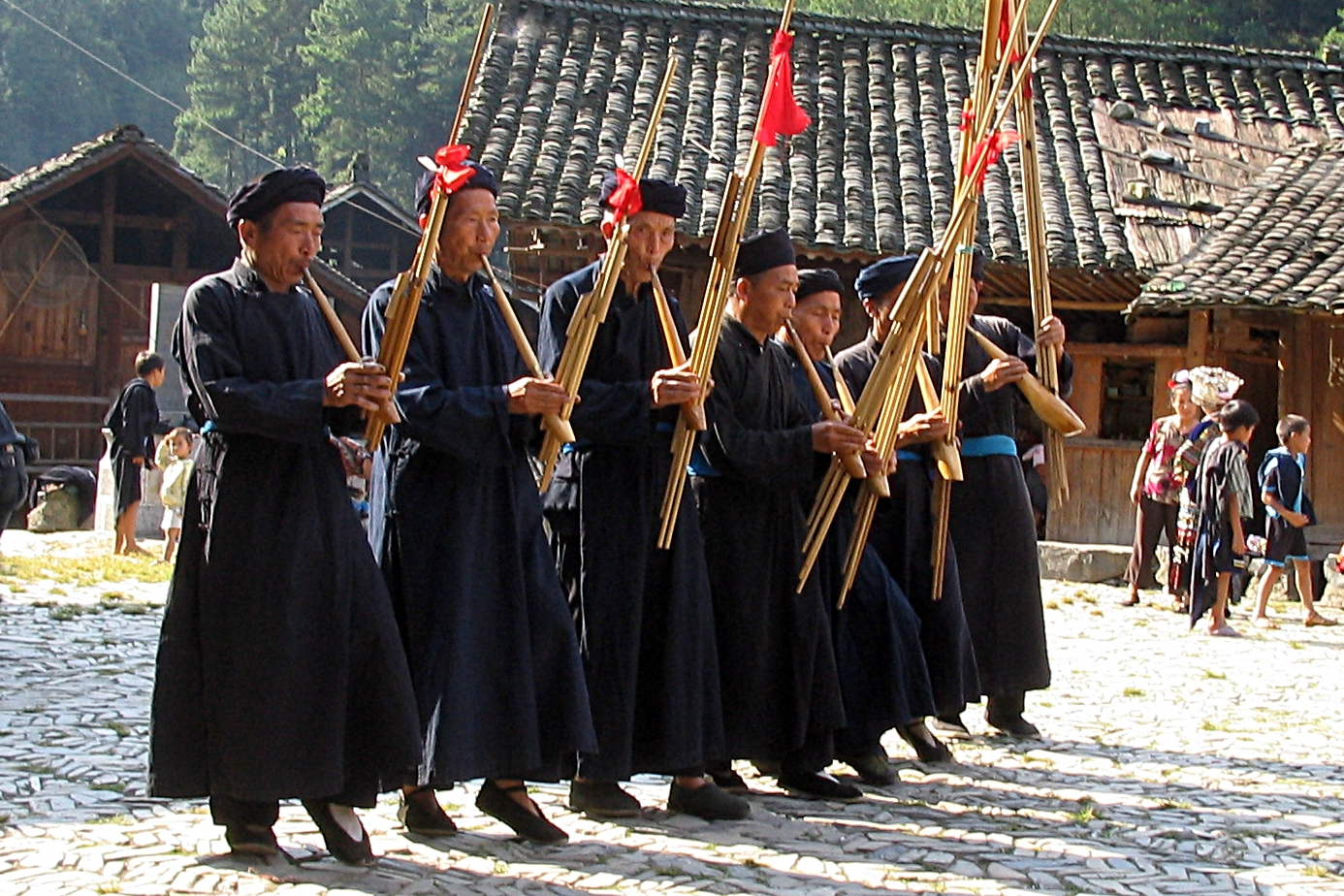
Miao musicians of Guizhou
