= Music of the Austral Islands =

The Austral Islands are part of the territory of French Polynesia. The music of the islands is similar to the music of other Polynesian islands. The largest of the Austral Islands is Tubuai, which is known for its ancient, atonal singing style, said to be the purest representation of pre-contact Polynesian music in French Polynesia.

The Encyclopædia Britannica has reported a carving, found on Raivavae, which depicts dancers alternating with rows of crescents, sometimes said to represent the distinctive skirts of the dancers. This carving style is used on traditional drums, as well as on houses and tapa.
