= Music of Murcia =

Murcia is a region in the South East of Spain with many external influences varying from the ancient Moors that occupied the area for centuries to the adjacent Communities (Andalusia, Castilla–La Mancha, etc.). Its music is determined by the heavy use of string instruments as the bandurria or the Spanish guitar and percussion instruments like the castanets ("castañuelas" or "postizas") and the tambourine.

Murcian music is most notably represented by the religious songs performed by the Auroros, which are derived from La Mancha and Andalusian folk music. They include a cappella chants, sometimes accompanied by church bells. They are often performed in small paths in orchards at night.

The cuadrilla is the typical folk ensemble of Murcia, which is traditionally organized by occupation or guild such as harvesters ("segaores" [sic]) or builders ("albañiles"), but now they are performed at celebrations and holidays, especially on Christmas by reduced bands with occasional dancing. The fandango murciano is a well-known variation of the Andalusian fandango characterized by long extensions of the voice. José Verdú's Cantos populares de Murcia is a well-known collection of Murcian songs.
