= Music of Jiangxi =

Jiangxi is a southeastern province of China. The area's musical heritage includes the Hakka music of Jiangzi, Fujian and Guangdong. Hakka music is literary and laid-back in tone, and consists entirely of five notes; many folk songs only use three notes.

Jiangxi's opera heritage is also important, having played a major role in the evolution of Beijing opera.

== History ==
Chinese music culture has deep roots in Jiangxi. Jiangxi has produced numerous folk songs and operas. The province's modern folk music is varied and abundant in substance, blending traditional Chinese elements with influences from abroad. Folks songs in Jiangxi are marked by straightforward melodies and rhyming lyrics. They are often spontaneously created by people during labor. Folk songs include love songs from the Ganxian Tian village and folk songs from Ruijin. The scholar Guo Xiaoying said that Jiangxi folk songs come in a wide variety of forms and can be classified into six types based on their performance settings, singing styles, and purposes. According to Guo, there are work songs, mountain songs, minor tunes, lantern songs, custom songs, and children's songs.

Jiangxi workers developed chant music that showed their appreciation for the fields and everyday life. Examples include "a mountain and a heavy day" from Yongxin County and "together" from Wan'an County. The minor-style music of Jiangxi is spontaneous, improvisational, and does not follow strict musical standards. It showcases people's everyday leisure activities. Examples are Jingdezhen's "abstract" and "Camellia road who came home guest".

Jiangxi experienced a Soviet period in the 1920s and 1930s, during which spoken word and folk songs were the most influential modes of artistic expression. Drawing on artistic tastes and regional customs, folk songs emerged as a broadly popular medium. On the other hand, spoken word proved more challenging since it brought an unfamiliar theatrical form foreign to Jiangxi's countryside communities. First seen in the cities, the friction of Western-inspired styles clashed with art oriented toward popular tastes. It exemplied the era's wider challenge of adapting a city-focused revolutionary effort to a rural environment. Jiangxi Soviet songs preserved some aspects of traditional folk songs yet introduced new traits. The critique of social inequalities remained a constant feature. Historically, folk songs frequently addressed peasants' difficulties and the injustices they endured. Although songs in the Jiangxi Soviet era had similar themes, they tended to conclude with an uplifting message, setting them apart from earlier examples.

Among Jiangxi's opera styles are Yiyang opera, Yihuang Opera, Guangchang Meng Opera, and Wuyuan Hui Opera.

== Bibliography ==
- Chen, Jing; Suvimolstienand, Chusak; Khochprasert, Jantana (December 2023). "Jiangxi Folk Songs: From Cultural Clues of Ceramic Music to Cultural Management". Journal of Roi Kaensarn Academi. 8 (12): 603–618.
- Guo, Xiaoying (June 2015). "Singing Style of Jiangxi Folk Song". Proceedings of the 2015 International Conference on Management, Education, Information and Control. Advances in Intelligent Systems Research. Vol. 125. Atlantis Press. pp. 1006–1012. doi:10.2991/meici-15.2015.175. ISBN 978-94-62520-85-1. ISSN 1951-6851.
- Judd, Elen R. (January 1983). "Revolutionary Drama and Song in the Jiangxi Soviet". Modern China. 9 (1): 127–160. doi:10.1177/009770048300900104.
- Liang, Jing (September 2017). "A Comprehensive Study on the Development of Folk Music Tourism Culture in Jiangxi". Destech Transactions on Social Science, Education and Human Science. doi:10.12783/dtssehs/ssme2017/12953. ISBN 978-1-60595-462-2 – via Internet Archive.
