= Music of Gascony =

Gascony is a region of France that has produced several well-known performers and composers of classical, folk and popular music. Gascony is home to several major music festivals. The town of Merciac in Gascony is home to an annual jazz festival, one of the biggest in France. The town of Mirande is also home to Le Country Musique, an annual country music festival.

== Folk music ==
Gascon folk music is known for a kind of small pipes called boha, which have a rectangular chanter and drone combination, (this form is unique to Gascony), and are made out of sheepskin with the fleece showing. The wandering performers known as troubadours and jongleurs were well established in Gascony.

Gascony, like many regions of France, and elsewhere in Europe, underwent a roots revival in the early to mid-1970s. The beginning of this trend in Gascony can be traced to the release of Musique Traditionelle de Gascogne by Perlinpinpin Folc, a band formed in 1972 and led by Christian Lamau.

Some twenty years later, this genre was revived with the repopularization of pastorales, an ancient form of musical theater. Rappadoc is a modern style of this music inspired by the jongleurs and troubadours of the region's history, using various lyrical styles in a satirical and topical performance.

Modern traditionally-styled bands from Gascony include Verd e Blu and Joan Francés Tisnèr.
