= Music of Castile and León =

Central Spain includes the cultural melting pot of Madrid and Castile. A down-tempo version of jota is common, as well as other dances as fandango, habas verdes, 5/8 charrada. Bagpipes are still used in northern León and Zamora provinces. Tabor pipe (in León) and dulzaina (a small shawm-like instrument) enjoy rich repertoires. Although dulzaina were popular in the folk music of Castile and León, the instrument is no longer manufactured and has become rare.

The city of Madrid is known for keeping its own version of chotis music. Salamanca is home to tuna, a form of serenade played on guitar, bandurria and tambourine, traditionally by students in medieval clothing.

Castilian dances include:

- Agudo
- Agudillo
- Charrada
- Fandango
- Jota
- Jotilla
- Habas verdes
- Rebolada

The Province of León is dominated by palatial dances that are extremely complex:

- Baile a lo Alto
- Baile del Pandero
- Danza de las Doncellas Cantadoras
- Danza de la Muerte
- El Corrido
- La Giraldilla
- Los Mandiles
- Zapateta
