= Khomys =

Instrument associated with Khakas culture

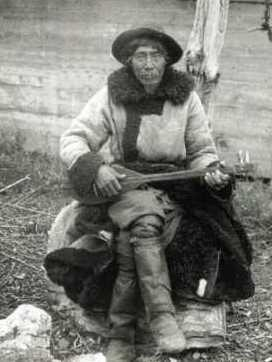
- Classification: String instrument

The khomys is a two- or rarely three-stringed plucked instrument, associated with Khakas culture. There are two types: the aghas-khomys and the topchyl-khomys.

== Construction ==
The body, neck, and head of the instrument are carved from a piece of cedar wood. Topchyl-khomys additionally have a piece of animal hide covering the soundboard.

The traditional khomys has strings made of horsehair tuned in fifths, a neck without frets, and a head with wooden pegs.

Modern khomys have frets and strings made of nylon or fishing line, and rarely metal. The length of the instrument ranges between 700 and 800 mm.

== Method of playing ==
Traditionally, the khomys is played while sitting, legs crossed, either on the ground or on a felt cloth or animal pelt. In this position, the instrument rests with its body on the player's knees.

Sound is produced by plucking and sliding blows on the strings with the index finger and thumb of the right hand. The fingers of the left hand press the upper string to the neck, thereby shortening or lengthening it and thus adjusting the sound's pitch.

== History ==
According to P.E. Ostrovskikh, at the end of the 19th century a khomys could be found "in every Khakas yurt". However, use of the instrument began to fade in the 1930s, and it completely fell out of use by the middle of the century.

In the late 1970s, a revival of Khakas folk instruments began. In the present day, the khomys is taught in music schools. It is the second most popular Khakas instrument, behind the Jadagan.

The khomys is used as a solo, accompanying, ensemble and orchestral instrument.
