= Music of the Aosta Valley =

The development of music in the Aosta Valley region of Italy reflects the multilingual make-up of the region including French, Valdôtain and recently Italian.

== History ==
Similarly to nearby Piedmont and nearby Alpine French-speaking regions (Savoy and Valais), music has much to do with the presence of medieval monasteries that preserved important musical manuscripts from the Middle Ages and also served as conduits of information and influence from areas to the north.

== Folk artists ==
The main modern singers and songwriters in Aosta Valley are:

- Naïf Hérin, from Quart;
- Louis de Jyaryot, from Ayas;
- Maura Susanna, from Saint-Vincent;
- Magui Bétemps, from Valtournenche.

The traditional Aostan songs in Valdôtain and in French form the core of the activity of the band Trouveur valdotèn.

== Village bands ==
The tradition of village bands is widely developed in the Valley for all age ranges. All bands gather once a year in Aosta during an event organized by the Federation des harmonies valdôtaines.

== Regional Symphony Orchestra ==
The city of Aosta is the home of a Youth Symphony and, since 1999, the Orchestre d'harmonie du Val d'Aoste, who regularly gives among others a New Year's concert (Concert du nouvel an) in Pont-Saint-Martin.

== Events ==
The main musical events in the Aosta Valley are:

- Aosta Classica: in the Aostan Roman Theatre
- Châteaux en musique: in the Savoy Castle, in the Issogne Castle, in the Saint-Pierre Castle, in the Sarre Castle and in the Verrès Castle
- Étoiles et musique

As well, Aosta hosts an International Festival of Chamber Music and an interesting Silent Film Festival with live musical accompaniment.
