= Music of the Andaman and Nicobar Islands =

The music of the Andaman and Nicobar Islands are a mixture of the indigenous cultures of the islands, as well as more recent cultural influencers from the descendants of the early settlers in the island from the Indian subcontinent. Folk traditions of the area include that of the Moken seafarers and various kinds of ritual tribal dance.

== Overview ==
=== Instruments ===
One instrument played on the Andaman Islands was a sounding board called a pū kuta yem nga. This is a large wooden board in the shape of an oval that is half-buried in the sand while the upper half is supported by a stone. While dancing, some of the dancers' steps will land on the board to create a rhythm for the dancers.

=== Dances ===
The women of the Gadaba tribe of the Nicobar Islands perform a courting dance.

=== Recordings ===
In 1888, the British naval officer Maurice Vidal Portman recorded Andamanese music and documented it using Western musical notation, which was published in the Journal of the Royal Asiatic Society. Portman's writings stated that Andamanese songs only had timpani accompaniment.

Curt Sachs, the German musicologist, noted the culture of song-generation on the Andaman Islands among native inhabitants:

"--and even the child are instructed in this art. While carving a boat or a bow, or while rowing, the Andamanese sings his song quietly to himself until he is satisfied with it and then introduces it at the next dance. His female relatives must first practice it with the women's chorus; the inventor himself, as song leader, sings it at the dance, and the women join in the refrain. If the piece is successful, it is added to his repertory; if not, it is discarded.
