= Music of the Balearic Islands =

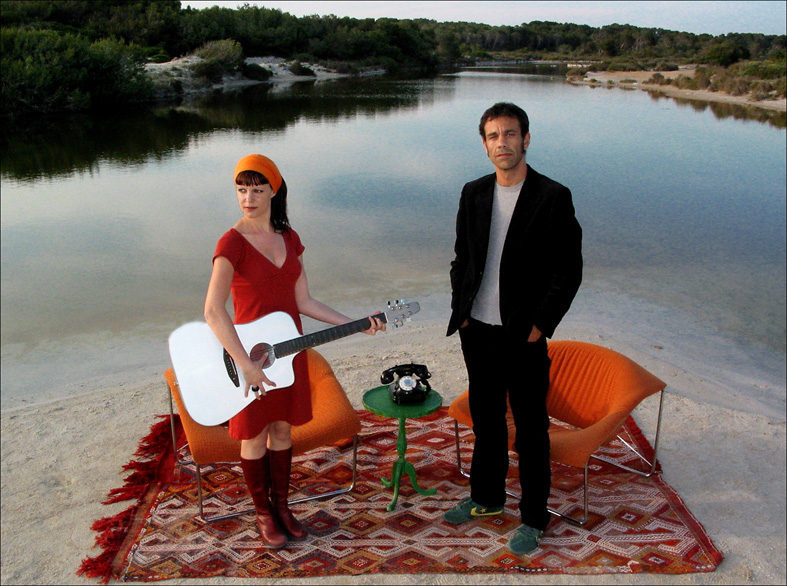
Vacabou, a trip-hop musical duo from Mallorca

Xeremiers, or colla de xeremiers, is a traditional ensemble consisting of the flabiol (a five-hole tabor pipe) and xeremies (bagpipes). Mallorca has produced popular singer-songwriters like Maria del Mar Bonet. British DJs like Paul Oakenfold made the vacationing island of Ibiza a capital of house music, leading to the creation of Balearic beat. Francesc Guerau and Antoni Literes are among the best known classical composers of the islands.
