= Music of Apulia =

The music of Apulia has had some glorious history as well as some very hard times. Located along the southern Adriatic, the area was part of Magna Grecia and certainly one of the centers of Ancient Greek music. And 1,000 years ago, Bari, on the coast, was a privileged sanctuary for pilgrims and Crusaders on their way to the Holy Land. Yet, the only musical relic that remains from the period is the Excultet, a representation from the 11th century of two angels playing trumpets that is preserved in the Basilica of San Nicola in Bari. Later, as part of the Kingdom of Naples, Apulia produced many memorable names in music, but like elsewhere in the south, many of them gravitated to Naples, the capital of the kingdom.

Further, economic hardships in the south following the unification of Italy through much of the 20th century resulted in massive emigration, a phenomenon hardly conducive to emphasis on music and the arts. Yet, modern Apulia has shown itself to be remarkably resilient and has an active, if still struggling, musical life.

== Folk music ==
Apulia was home to the well-known folk song revivalist Matteo Salvatore.

The healing tarantolati ritual is an important part of Apulian folk culture. The ritual is centered on Saint Paul and women (tarantolati) who are said to have been bitten by a tarantula. The poison from the bite is said to be healed by dancing, sometimes for hours or even days. The dances include the tarantella and tarantata, and is accompanied by tamburelli and either violin, organetto or guitar.

== Brass bands ==
Apulia is known for its brass band tradition, which includes the Bando Ruvo di Puglia, led by Pino Minafra. In recent music, this brass band tradition has involved many of the region's jazz performers.

== Music venues ==
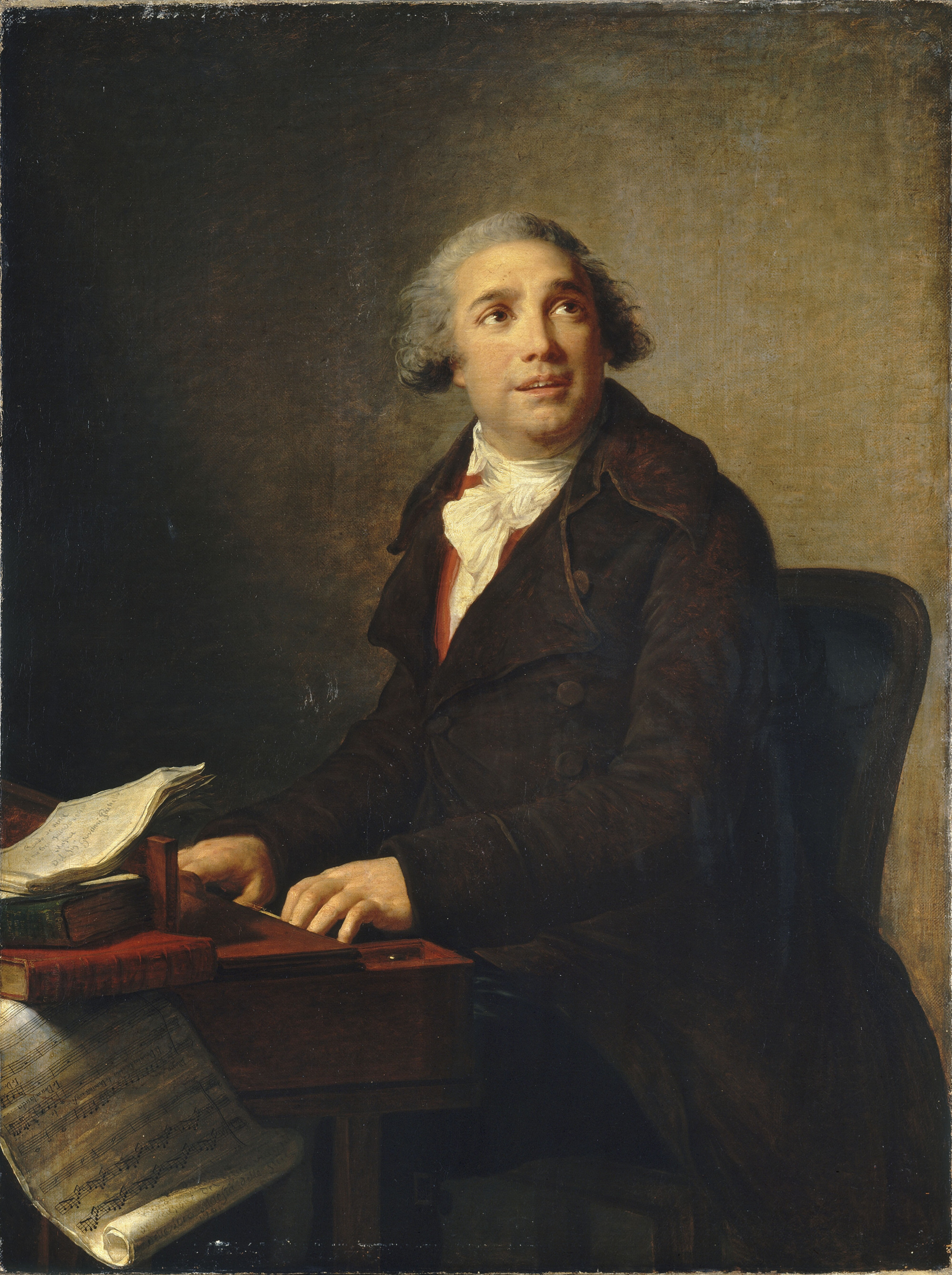
Paisiello at the clavichord, by Marie Louise Élisabeth Vigée-Lebrun, 1791. Paisiello was a native of Apulia

The Petruzzelli Operatic and Symphonic Foundation of Bari is the organization around which much of the cultural life of the city revolves. It is named for the famous Teatro Petruzzelli, the center of music life in the city and province, but which fell victim to a disastrous fire in 1991 and reopened just in 2009. Taking up that slack, however, are other venues: the Basilica of San Nicola, the premises of the Piccinni Conservatory, and the Teatro Piccinni (now closed). The city of Bari also hosts the interesting Kismet Theater, a permanent theatrical and musical workshop, open to the public 6 days a week, the aim of which is to encourage those activities among the youth.

Brindisi's new Verdi Theater had its first concert in 2002. The theater is an impressive hyper modern structure that seats 1200 and was built near the presumed place where the poet Virgil is said to have died. The area contains significant Roman archaeology, which caused delays in the completion of the new concert hall.

The city and province of Foggia are noted as the birthplace of composer Umberto Giordano and much musical activity recalls that fact. The main venue for opera was built in 1828 and was renamed the Giordano Theater in 1928. The city has a secondary theater, named for Giuseppe Verdi.

Lecce was the birthplace of the great tenor, Tito Schipa. It also hosts a music conservatory and is the home of the Salento Chamber ensemble. The Teatro Comunale is named for Giovanni Paisiello, one of the great names in 18th century Neapolitan comic opera.

The "city on two seas", Taranto, recalls its connection to ancient Greece in the names of musical organizations such as the Magna Grecia Orchestra, the Ionian Art Orchestra and the Magna Grecia Choir. The area hosts the Association for the Music of Paisiello (born here), sponsors the annual Nicolosi Song Competition, and is the site of the internationally known Valle d'Itria Festival. It takes place in July and August, during which time the entire city of Taranto becomes a collection of venues for music of various sorts. It is considered one of the most important cultural manifestations in southern Italy.
