= Music of Henan =

Henan, is a central province of China, is known for its unique guzheng technique, you yao, which involves using the right hand to pluck the strings and the left to press them at the other end, producing a rich sound. This technique has evolved into Qu opera.

Henan's folk heritage includes ballads and is characterized by large position changes and gliding vibrato. A popular form of narrative singing, which is accompanied by a bowed lute called zhuihu, is called zhuizi. The songs' lyrics were traditionally Taoist religious stories, poems, or chants.
