= Music of Shaanxi =

Musical traditions of Shaanxi, China

Music of Shaanxi refers to the musical traditions of Shaanxi, a province in northwestern China. The province's music includes regional folk-song traditions, opera styles, and ritual and instrumental ensemble music. Sources on Shaanxi music commonly distinguish between the traditions of northern Shaanxi, the Guanzhong plain in central Shaanxi, and southern Shaanxi, each of which has its own vocal style and repertory.

Northern Shaanxi folk song is the best-known branch of the province's traditional music. According to the Shaanxi provincial government, northern Shaanxi folk songs include more than 20 subtypes, among them xintianyou, minor melodies, drinking songs and other local song forms; the tradition was entered on China's national intangible cultural heritage list in 2008. Xintianyou, often described as the most characteristic song form of northern Shaanxi, is a mountain-song genre with comparatively free rhythm and a simple melodic outline; provincial sources describe it as a song form whose texts commonly deal with labour, everyday life and love. Southern Shaanxi has its own representative song traditions, especially Ziyang folk songs, while mid-Shaanxi is associated with older work-song and minor-song repertories from the Guanzhong region.

The best-known theatrical music of Shaanxi is Qinqiang, a form of xiqu that takes its name from the historical Qin region. The University of Leeds's Digital Library of Chinese Theatre describes qinqiang as one of the oldest genres in Chinese theatre and places it within the bangzi or clapper-based musical system. The same source notes that qinqiang is widespread not only in Shaanxi but also across Gansu, Ningxia, Qinghai and Xinjiang, and that its repertory and singing practice vary by region. Shaanxi provincial material identifies four local routes of qinqiang within the province: Tongzhou Bangzi in the Dali area, Xi'an Luantan around Xi'an, Xifu Qinqiang in the Fengxiang area, and Handiao Huanghuang in the Hanzhong area. Qinqiang was included in the first national list of intangible cultural heritage in China in 2006.

Another major Shaanxi tradition is the Xi'an wind and percussion ensemble, a ceremonial repertory associated with the ancient capital of Xi'an. UNESCO states that the ensemble has been performed for more than a millennium and combines drums, wind instruments and sometimes male chorus. It is used especially for religious occasions such as temple fairs and funerals, and its surviving notation preserves musical materials traced to the Tang and Song dynasties.

Shaanxi folk music has also influenced modern Chinese popular music. The well-known northern Shaanxi song Lan Huahua became nationally familiar in the 20th century; the National Centre for the Performing Arts describes it as a popular folk song first sung in the 1930s and centred on a young woman who rebels against feudal constraints. In the 1980s, the mainland popular-music style known as Northwest Wind drew heavily on folk elements from northwestern China. In a doctoral thesis on Chinese popular music, Na Li identifies northern folk materials, including xintianyou from northern Shaanxi, as one of the main melodic sources of that style.
