= Music of Auvergne =

Auvergne is a region in France. Its best-known form of folk music is that played on the cabrette (little goat in Auvergnat), a bagpipe made of goatskin. This is used to play swift, 3/8 dance music, slow airs (regrets) and other styles. The traditional master Joseph Rouls taught many modern players, including Dominique Paris, Jean Bona and Michel Esbelin. Other styles of music include the shepherd's calls known as ballero.

Joseph Canteloube was a well-known composer from Auvergne in the early 20th century, and produced a famous collection of folk music called Songs of the Auvergne.

The hurdy-gurdy became the basis for bal-musette music, which arrived in Paris by 1880 as a result of Auvergnat migration. The influence of Antoine Bouscatel led to bal-musette incorporating the Italian accordion, which soon came to dominate the music. This is the period that produced internationally known masters like Léon Chanal, Emile Vacher and Martin Cayla. Vacher's light style, rhythmic nature and distinctive tremolo defined the genre for many audiences in France and beyond. During World War I, elements of American jazz became a part of bal-musette. The style also became the basis for a genre called valse musette.

Other Auvergnat musicians include Patrick Desaunay and Jean-Louis Murat.
