= Music of Anhui =

Anhui is a province of China. The Huangmei opera, originally from Hubei, has a long history in Anhui, especially Anqing City, from which it spread to Beijing, Shanghai and elsewhere.
