= Music of Campania =

As one moves away from Naples in almost any direction, there is prominent musical activity to be found. These include, for example, the restoration and use of a number of the so-called "Vesuvian villas" in and near Ercolano (ancient Herculaneum), a string of once luxurious villas built in the 18th century and severely damaged by aerial bombardment in World War II. The most prominent of these is the Villa Campolieto, already restored, open and the site of chamber concerts by the Alessandro Scarlatti association.

The most important musical activity on the islands in the Bay of Naples is on the island of Ischia on the premises of the Mortella Gardens and Villa, the site of the William Walton Foundation, which hosts a yearly music and opera workshop.

The Flavian amphitheater in Pozzuoli, one of the greatest such structures in the ancient world, has undergone extensive restoration and is the site of outdoor summer concerts. Also, since 1985, the cloister of St. Francis in the town of Sorrento has hosted the annual Summer of Music in Sorrento, an extensive program of classical music.

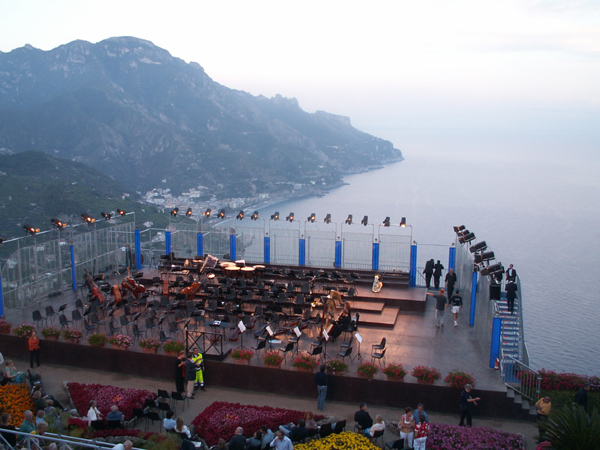
The annual Festival of Ravello is a popular music venue in Italy. Here, an orchestra starts to set up on a stage overlooking the Amalfi coast.

Further afield, in other provinces of the region, the city of Avellino has two prominent musical facilities: the Domenico Cimarosa Conservatory and, after a century without a decent opera house, the new Carlo Gesualdo Theater, opened in 2002 with a presentation of Mozart's The Marriage of Figaro

The city of Benevento has put to musical use some of its considerable array of ancient Roman archaeology, most prominently the Roman Theater from the 2nd century. Various musical activities are hosted there as part of the city's ongoing self-promotion as the City of "Spettacoli". The city also has a music conservatory located in the large Palazzo De Simone.

The city of Caserta is best known as the site of the "Versailles of Italy", the gigantic Bourbon Royal Palace built by Luigi Vanvitelli in the mid-18th century. The court theater on the premises is the site of frequent concerts, as are the new Communal Theater and the nearby San Leucio complex, an old silk-producing facility and site of a yearly music festival, the eclectic motto of which is "From Giovanni Paisiello to Frank Zappa". Caserta is the only provincial capital in the Campania region without a music conservatory.

The province of Salerno includes Ravello on the Amalfi coast with the famous Ravello Festival, certainly one of the important musical and artistic affairs in Italy. The city of Salerno has its own permanent opera company (the only one in the region except for Naples). The city is also the site of the fine Giuseppe Martucci conservatory as well as the newly reopened Verdi Theater.
