= Music of Trentino-Alto Adige/Südtirol =

The music of Trentino-Alto Adige/Südtirol reflects the multilingual and multiethnic make-up of the region. The strong traditions of choral singing, village bands, and folk music are nurtured both by the Italian and German speakers of the area.

== Musical venues and activities ==
=== Trentino ===
Historically, of course, the city of Trento has given its name to the Council of Trent, the conclave that started the Roman Catholic Counter-Reformation in the mid-16th century. The city had, thus, a somewhat austere reputation as not being particularly given to the beginnings of commercial music and public theaters or other activities beyond the confines of ecclesiastical music.

The first commercial theatrical and musical ventures had to await the years following the incorporation of the region into the short-lived French satrapy called the Republic of Lombardy, set up by Napoleon in 1796. Even though that political entity did not survive Napoleon, himself, the anti-clerical social forces set in motion did. Thus, the first theater and public musical venue in the city of Trento was the Teatro Mazzurana (later renamed the Teatro Sociale), opened in 1819. For many years, it was the only venue for music or theater in the city. Failing fortunes led to its closure in 1983, but it was refurbished and reopened in the year 2000. It is now one of four auditoriums in the city, with the Auditorium, the Sperimentale, and the San Marco theater.

The city is also the site of the Bonporti music conservatory, which hosts an annual Mondi Sonori (Worlds of Sound) festival as well as the International Antonio Pedrotti Orchestral Conducting Competition.

The nearby town of Ala is the site of the Antique Piano Museum. It is a private museum, housed on the premises of the Palazzo de' Pizzini-di Lenna, an edifice from the 17th century and one that has also housed names such as Empress Maria Theresa of Austria, Mozart, and Napoleon. The museum specializes not just in conserving the instruments, but in restoring them to historically accurate and playable condition.

The town of Rovereto, too, is astride the old Vienna-to-Italy trail; it has a number of its own "Mozart played here" landmarks and hosts an annual Mozart Festival. The Ancient Music Society of the city also hosts a rather unusual music competition involving performances on original, historical instruments. The town of Riva del Garda (on Lake Garda) has a music conservatory and hosts the annual Garda Music Festival.

=== South Tyrol ===
South Tyrol (German: Südtirol) is the name of the other half of this region. The main town is Bolzano. Besides the New Communal Theater, the city boasts the Claudio Monteverdi music conservatory and the Konzerthaus. An annual Ferruccio Busoni Music Competition takes place, and there is a Gustav Mahler Academy, as well. The wooded area near the town of Toblach preserves the cottage in which Mahler lived and composed his last two symphonies. An annual Mahler Festival is held there.
