= Music of Lombardy =

Besides Milan, the region of Lombardy has 10 other provinces, each named for the largest city and capital of the respective province: Bergamo, Brescia, Como, Cremona, Lecco, Lodi, Mantova, Pavia, Sondrio, and Varese. Musically, they offer:

- Bergamo: the birthplace of Gaetano Donizetti; thus, there is the Teatro Donizetti and the Donizetti Musical Institute, housing a museum dedicated to the life and work of the composer. The city is also the home of the Benvenuto Terzi Guitar Association and a Society for Ancient Music. There is an annual jazz festival in the nearby town of Clusone.
- Brescia: the site of the spectacular Teatro Grande, built in 1709; Brescia also hosts the famous Arturo Benedetti Michelangeli International Piano Competition, named for the pianist, born in the city. The Luca Marenzio music conservatory is also located here.
- Como: the Teatro Sociale in the city of Como is home to the Lyric Concert Association as well as an opera series entitled Opera...domani (Opera...tomorrow).The city is also an important new venue for the presentation of electronic music.
- Cremona: the city is most famously associated with the craft of violin making and illustrious practitioners of that trade, such as the Amati Family, Guarneri Family and Stradivarius. The city is still an active site for aspiring craftsmen and hosts the Stradivarius Scuola internazionale di liuteria, as well as various associations dedicated to the promotion of violin making. Claudio Monteverdi was born in Cremona and was a student of Marc'Antonio Ingegneri.
- Lecco: the Harmonia Gentium association promotes significant concerts of sacred music on the premises of the Basilica of San Nicolò. The main theater in the city is the Teatro della Società.
- Lodi: the city's claim to musical fame is that a 14-year-old Mozart wrote his first string quartet here. The Teatro delle Vigne is the main venue for music and is on the premises of the ancient monastery of San Giovanni e Ognisanti alle Vigne. It hosts a musical archive and a series of autumn concerts.
- Mantua: the city was home to many illustrious names in the late 16th and early 17th centuries, the early days of opera. The prominent members of the Florentine Camerata lived here, as did Claudio Monteverdi, whose opera Orfeo, often cited as the "first opera", was composed for the Timidi music academy. The Teatro Accademica goes back to the 1760s, when Mantua was still part of the Austrian Empire. It was built at the behest of the Empress Maria Theresa and is remembered as the venue where the child prodigy Mozart displayed his youthful musical prowess in a series of recitals. Mantua is also the site of the Lucio Campinai music conservatory, home to the Chamber Orchestra of Mantua.
- Pavia: the Teatro Fraschini was opened in 1773, later went through a period when it served as a barracks for the Austrian army, and was later restored to its historic splendour. Currently it is the home venue of the Pavia Chamber Ensemble.
- Sondrio: the Villa Quadrio serves as the site for chamber concerts (in the absence of a functioning public theater). The Torelli auditorium hosts frequent concerts of folk choral music by the CAI Choir of Sandrio.
- Varese: Venues include the Palazzo Estense, the Villa Cagnola, and the Civic Music Highschool. In nearby Busto Arsizio, there is a permanent chamber music ensemble.
