= Music of Heilongjiang =

Heilongjiang is a province in northeastern China. Its capital city, Harbin, is a "major concert center." The city is home to a symphony orchestra, and also celebrates Harbin Summer Music Festival.
