= Music of Fujian =

The Chinese province of Fujian has musical traditions that can be traced back to at least the Tang dynasty. Today the music of Fujian can be heard not only in the province itself, but also in overseas communities, particularly Taiwan.

Traditional music includes a variety of folk and classical styles.

Nanyin or nanguan music s a style of music that dates back to the period between the Sui and Tang eras, in the 7th century. The city of Quanzhou was a major city at the time, and was situated upon an important maritime trade route, bringing elements of distant cultures to the city. The result was what is now known as nanyin or nanguan music, regarded as a "living fossil" of ancient Chinese music. The cities of Xiamen and Quanzhou have applied to UNESCO for recognition as Masterpieces of the Oral and Intangible Heritage of Humanity.

Hakka music is literary and laid-back in tone, and consists entirely of five notes; many folk songs only use three notes.

Shifan is a kind of music that dates to the Qing dynasty, when it was a kind of percussive music that accompanied the Dragon Lantern Dance. Over time, string and wind instruments were added.

Chanhe arose at the Chanhe School of Buddhism, from the chanting accompanied by percussion instruments like chimes and drums. In the early 1920s, wind and string instruments were added.

Modern musical institutions in Fujian include the Quanzhou Nanyin Music Ensemble, founded in the early 1960s, and the Fuzhou Folk Music Ensemble founded in 1990. There is also a Music and Dance Festival of Fujian Province and a Baihua Arts and Cultural Festival of Fuzhou Municipality.

== See also ==
- Beiguan music
