= Music of Meghalaya =

Meghalaya is a state of India with a rich folk tradition. Drums, bamboo flutes and small hand-held cymbals are a popular ensemble. The arrival of Christianity in the mid-20th century signalled the beginning of a decline in tribal musical traditions.

With time, the music scene in Meghalaya kept on evolving leading to the birth of many talented musicians and bands representing both local as well as not so local genres from Meghalaya. Some of the more recent musicians and bands from Meghalaya include the Soulmate, Lou Majaw, Snow White, Plague Throat, Kerios Wahlang, Cryptographik Street Poets, etc.

In March 2024, president of India Droupadi Murmu felicitated Helen, who promoted the music of Meghalaya. In late 2022 and 2023, a five member band, Da Minot Band, started playing Khasi music and began to popularise the tribal sounds of Khasi and Jaintia hills.

== Famous proponents of Meghalaya music ==
- Helen Giri
