= Music of Uttar Pradesh =

Overview of music traditions in Uttar Pradesh, India

Uttar Pradesh is a state of India. The region's folk heritage includes songs called rasiya (known especially in Braj), which celebrate the divine love of Radha and Shri Krishna. These songs are played by large drums known as bumb, and are performed at many festivals.

During the eras of Guptas and Harsh Vardhans, Uttar Pradesh was a major center for musical innovation.

Folk dances or folk theatre forms include:

- Ghazals
- Thumri
- Khayal
- Marsiya
- Naqal (mimicry)
- Nautanki
- Qawwali
- Ramlila
- Raslila
- Swang
