= Music of Vatican City =

As the seat of the Papacy, the Vatican City and its predecessor, the Papal States, has played an important role in the development of Christian music. They perform chants of ancient origin, such as Gregorian chants, as well as modern polyphonic music. The papal choir is a well-known institution that dates back more than four hundred years. Singers were originally from northern Europe, but began arriving more from Spain and Italy in the 16th century. At this time, church authorities became concerned about the words of liturgical texts being drowned out by the traditional melodies. As a result, reformers like Giovanni Palestrina revised the rules behind Gregorian chanting and Germanium, which were printed by the Medici Press in Rome; these reforms continued to be followed to the present day. A traditional musical instrument was the pipe organ.

After the end of the Papal States, the Popes' ability to sponsor composers and musicians waned. However, it did not end entirely nor did interest in the subject. Pope Pius X and Pope Pius XII both wrote on the subject. In modern times, John Harbison and Gilbert Levine have composed or conducted for the Vatican.

Although not of the Vatican, a Christmas concert where popular musicians performed had been held at the Vatican for thirteen years until ending in 2006. Notable performers at it included José Feliciano, Thelma Houston, Dionne Warwick, Gloria Gaynor, and B. B. King. The concert created controversy in 2003 due to statements by Lauryn Hill who used the opportunity to criticize the Vatican over Roman Catholic sex abuse cases.

Pope Pius XII declared "Pontifical Hymn" the national anthem of Vatican City on 16 October 1949. It replaced Viktorin Hallmayer's "Marcia trionfale" (1857), which, being still the papal anthem when the Vatican City State was founded in 1929, had been treated also as the new state's anthem.

== See also ==
- Wake Up!
- Sistine Chapel Choir
- List of Roman Catholic Church musicians
- Roman School
- Index of Vatican City-related articles
