= Music of São Tomé and Príncipe =

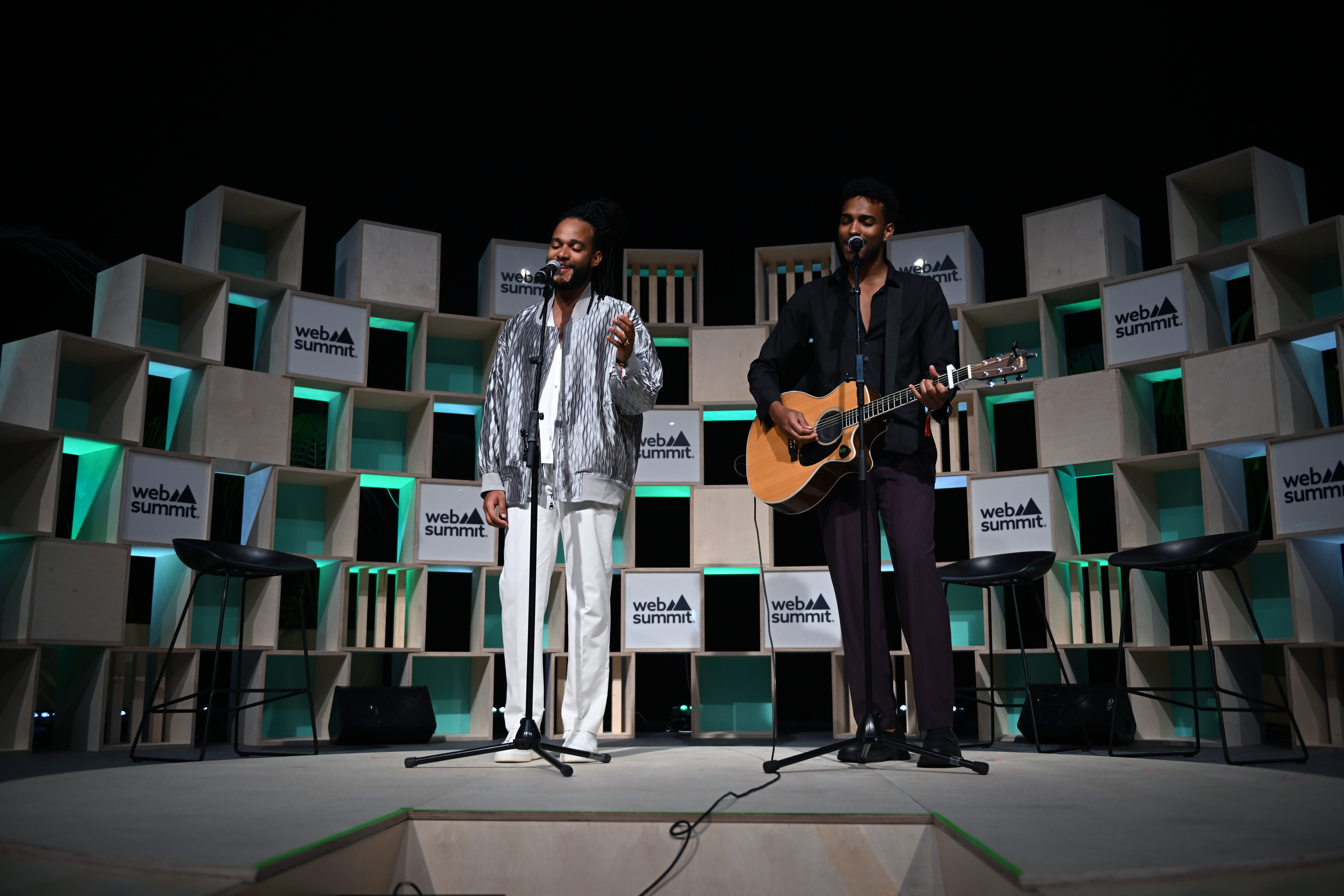
Calema performing in 2022.

São Tomé and Príncipe is an island country off the coast of Africa. Culturally, the people are African but have been highly influenced by the Portuguese rulers of the islands.

São Toméans are known for ússua and socopé rhythms, while Principe is home to the dêxa beat. Portuguese ballroom dancing may have played an integral part in the development of these rhythms and their associated dances.

Tchiloli is a musical dance performance that tells a dramatic story. The danço-congo is similarly a combination of music, dance and theatre.

== Popular music ==
The godfathers of São Toméan popular music was the band Leoninos, which was founded in 1959 by Quintero Aguiar. The group were well known as spokesmen for the people of São Tomé and Príncipe, and were champions of their culture. Leoninos was banned by the Portuguese radio station after he released "Ngandu", which criticized the Portuguese colonialists.

Leoninos broke up in 1965, but were followed by Os Úntués, led by Leonel Aguiar, who added American, Argentinian, Congolese and Cuban musical influences, and introduced the electric guitar and other innovations. Popular music from the islands began to diversify, as bands like Quibanzas and Africa Negra. Among these groups was Mindelo, who fused São Toméan rhythms with rebita, an Angolan style, to form puxa.

In the latter part of the 20th century, songwriters like Zarco and Manjelegua found a domestic audience, and São Toméan-Portuguese musicians like Camilo Domingos, Juka, Filipe Santo, Açoreano, Gapa established a Lisbon-based scene.

Other 21st century singers who follow similar steps are Flavia, Bruna Lee, Marisyah, Calema.

=== Kizomba ===
Kizomba is an Angolan popular music and it was born out of Zouk music. Kizomba supports a fairly large number of artistes singing in both English and Portuguese.
