= Music of the Northwest Territories =

The Northwest Territories are a territory of Canada. Notable musicians from the region include singer-songwriter Susan Aglukark, and two-time Juno Award-winning Dene artist Leela Gilday.

Music festivals held in the Northwest Territories include Folk on the Rocks (typically held in Yellowknife in the middle of July), the Great Northern Arts Festival (which is held annually in Inuvik to celebrate the culture of the northern peoples of Canada), and the South Slave Friendship Festival (which is also held later in the summer in Fort Smith).

Over its 30 years, Folk on the Rocks has attracted many southern artists including Stan Rogers, Sam Roberts, Buffy St. Marie, Gord Downie and many acts from around the world. Some of the more interesting aspects of the festival are the unique workshops that combine artists from the North with entertainers from the south or overseas. For instance, the Mongolian Tuva group Chirgilchin performed an impromptu set with some traditional Inuit throat-singers, which created some never before heard music.

The Midway Lake Music Festival is held annually among the Teetl'it Gwich'in, one of the First Nations of the Northwest Territories. At Midway Lake, Gwich'in musicians performer jigs, waltzes and square dances, which were imported by fur traders in the 19th century.

The fiddle is a common traditional instrument in the Northwest Territories.
