= Music of Palau =

The music of Palau finds its heritage in Micronesia, but it has been supplemented with influences from the United States and Western Europe, as well as Japan.

The government department of the Republic of Palau and Director of the Bureau of Arts and Culture are in charge of developing and implementing cultural policies is the Ministry of Community and Cultural Affairs. "Belau rekid", the national anthem of Palau, was written by Ymesei O. Ezekiel, and has been the anthem since 1980.

There are no intellectual property restrictions in Palau.

The modern Palauan pop music scene began in the mid-1980s . The country recorded popular sound includes element of Japanese music, legacy of a period of Japanese domination . The American influence can be heard in a distinctly Palauan form of country music. Popular performers include IN-X-ES, whose "Mousubes" was a major commercial success in 1999.
