= Music of French Polynesia =

The music of French Polynesia came to the forefront of the world music scene in 1992, with the release of The Tahitian Choir's recordings of unaccompanied vocal Christian music called himene tārava, recorded by French musicologist Pascal Nabet-Meyer. This form of singing is common in French Polynesia and the Cook Islands, and is distinguished by a unique drop in pitch at the end of the phrases, which is a characteristic formed by several different voices; it is also accompanied by steady grunting of staccato, nonsensical syllables.

== See also ==
- Tahitian Drumming
- Tahitian music
