= Music of Jharkhand =

The music tradition of Jharkhand, India, consisting of various folk and tribal forms, is known for its diversity. People of Jharkhand are very fond of music and dance.

Jhumair is one of the major folk forms of Jharkhand and shares a lot with the jhumair forms of the Purulia and the Bankura districts of West Bengal and also some of the neighbouring states of Bihar. Jhumair is typically a folk performance, performed to the accompaniment of traditional instruments like Mandar and Nagara. They are performed at harvest season and festivals and usually deal with the theme of love and romance. Domkach is folk music which is performed at weddings. It is accompanied by musical instruments such as nagara, Dhak and Shehnai.

== Prominent folk artists of Jharkhand ==
- Mukund Nayak
- Ram Dayal Munda
