= Music of Arunachal Pradesh =

Arunachal Pradesh is a state of India. It is known for dance music, which comes in many different styles. Dances from the region are often ritual in nature, but are also celebratory. They are mostly group dances, though others are restricted to men. Dances include popir, ponung and pasi kongki (of the Adi), rekham pada (of the Nishing), aji lhamu (of the Monpa) and hiirii khaniing (of the Apatani).

== Idu Mishmi ritual dance ==
The Idu Mishmis have a ritual dance and a fertility dance. The ritual dance is performed by the priest or priestess in the ceremonies of Ai-ah, Ai-him, Mesalah and Rren. The fertility dance is performed on the last day of the Rren ceremony.

There is no definite myth about the origin of this ritual dance. According to local tradition, the first priest who officiated in a funeral ceremony was Chineuhu and his brother Ahihiuh, was the first priest who officiated in the other three ceremonies in which this dance forms a part. This dance is associated with the priestly office.

Besides the priest, there are three or four other dancers who are selected from amongst the spectators. In addition, it is the usual dress which consists of a loin-cloth, a short-sleeved coat, and a sword slung on the right side, a leather bag slung on the left side and a few bead-necklaces, the priest wears a few other articles. These articles are an apron with particular designs, a head-band decorated with two or three rows of cowries, a necklace studded with the teeth of tiger and bear and a few metal bells. A priestess wears these special articles in addition to the usual Mishmi woman's dress of a skirt, a long-sleeved coat and bead-necklaces. The priestess is generally accompanied by female dancers. The accompanying dancers wear the usual dress.

The dancers stand in a line, the priest is second either from the right or left. During the dance, one dancer standing at one end of the line plays a small drum slung from his neck. The priest and the other two dancers play a very small semi-globular single-membrane drum, striking it with a bamboo-stick which is kept tied to the drum with a string. The fifth dancer, if any, plays a horn bugle. When there are five dancers, the priest stands in the middle of the line. He sings a line of invocatory song while all the others play the musical instruments, flex the knees bobbing up and down and alternately raise the right and left heels and stamp these on the ground in time to the drum-beats. When the priest finishes singing the line, others repeat it in chorus. Again the priest sings another line of the song which the others repeat in chorus and thus it goes on.

After a prelude of flexing of knees and stamping of heels, they place one foot forward and immediately bring the other up beside it. If in the first step, the right foot is taken forward, then in the next step it is the left one. After each step, they flex the knees. Thus, they dance forward to the accompaniment of drumbeats and invocatory song. When they have danced forward for some distance, they dance backward with the same movement. Thus they dance moving forward and backward.

Sometimes they break away from the line formation and the four dancers standing in the four corners sing an invocatory song, play the musical instruments and dance flexing the knees and raising the right and left heel alternately and stamping these on the ground. Now and then they change positions dancing all the time but facing inward. Sometimes they dance in a circle following one another with tripping steps.

In another movement, they dance sideways either in a clockwise or anti-clockwise direction. They stand in a semicircle and in the anti-clockwise movement, they take one step with the right foot to the right and immediately bring the left foot beside the right one. Thus they dance in a circle, flexing the knees after each step.

The priest does not demand any money for his priestly services, but the performer usually remunerates him according to his ability. The remuneration may also be paid in kind, e.g. with handloom coat, brass utensils or pigs.

The music (Hindi: संगीत) is diverse because of India's vast cultural diversity. Though it might be started with devotional songs later it covered each & every part of contemporary human life including psychology, philosophy, anatomy(Deha-Tatva), socio-economic condition, love, day to day living etc. and in many of them you will find deep insight into life. There are numerous eminent bards/saints or Fakirs who had contributed a lot in this field. A few of them are Kabir, Moinuddin Chishti, Lalon Fakir and many more. Main classification can be done based on the regional languages. It has many forms including bhangr, lavani, dandiya and Rajasthani. The arrival of movies and pop music weakened folk music's popularity, but saints and poets to have large musical libraries and traditions to their name, often sung in thumri semi-the folk music of India is dance-oriented.

== Dances and music about Gita Govinda Project ==
Dance forms an important aspect of the socio-cultural heritage of the people. They dance on important rituals, during festivals and also for recreation. The dances of the people of Arunachal are group- where both men and women take part. There are however some dances such as igo dance of the Mishmi priests, war dance of the Adis, Noctes and Wanchos, ritualistic dance of the Buddhist tribes, which are male dances. Females are not allowed to participate in these dances. Some of the popular folk dances of the people are Aji Lamu (Monpa), Roppi (Nishing), Buiya (Nishing), Hurkani (Apatani), Popir (Adi), Pasi Kongki(Adi), Chalo (Nocte), Ponung (Adi), Rekham Pada (Nishing), Lion and Peacock dance (Monpa) and so on. Most dances are performed to the accompaniment of songs sung generally in chorus. Musical instruments like drums and Cymbals are played.

The folksong of Pailibos relate more to their folk history, mythology and description of their known past. Themes of songs are like fables involving creatures or the animal and urgent words signifying moral deduction.

Following are their chief folksong, sung on different occasion:

- Ja-Jin-Ja: On occasion of feasts and merriment, during marriages or other social meets, this song is sung. Both men and women sing it in chorus or individually. But once the song starts, all those who are present join them in singing.
- Baryi: It is a song which narrate their history, their religious lore and mythology. Its whole cycle takes hours to complete. It is also a feature of festivals or of occasion of important social or religious gatherings.

Both Ja-Jin-Ja and Baryi produce a nostalgic feeling in Pailibos as the glories of the past ancestors are narrated through them.

- Nyioga: It is sung when a marriage ceremony is concluded and the bridal party returns leaving the bride in her home. The theme is that of the joy. It contains pieces of advice to the bride for her future life.

== See also ==
- Music of India
