= Music of Yukon =

With the Klondike Gold Rush, a number of folk songs from Yukon became popular, including "Rush to the Klondike" (1897, written by W. T. Diefenbaker), "The Klondike Gold Rush", "I've Got the Klondike Fever" (1898) and "La Chanson du Klondyke".

Yukon has a very active and live music scene, with a relatively large number of artists as well as a number of music festivals. Guitarist, vocalist and songwriter Jerry Alfred won the Juno Award for Best Aboriginal Recording in 1995, while Matthew Lien has topped the charts in Taiwan.

The major festivals include the Dawson City Music Festival, Frostbite Music Festival in Whitehorse, and the Atlin Arts & Music Festival held in Atlin, though located just outside Yukon, is mostly attended by Yukoners, since 2003. The Alsek Music Festival in Haines Junction was held for 16 years but has skipped 2009 and 2010.
