= Music of Maharashtra =

Maharashtra is a state of India. The region's folk heritage includes boards, Gondhals, Lavanis-(Lavani or Lavni is all about how much emotion your face can propagate into. Mastery is different in this dance form and is Maharashtra's cherished factors which are disappearing rapidly.) Shahiris and Powada. Sharang Dev, a 13th-century composer, was from Maharashtra as well.

== Aagri - Koli Geet ==
" Aagri - Koli Geet " is one of the most recognized folk music of India. It is popular in western parts of Maharashtra. Aagri - Koli Geet has almost 300-year-old tradition in Maharashtra. It has its own dance form. Example: Me hay Koli

== Natya Sangeet ==
One of the semi-classical music forms of Maharashtra is " Natya Sangeet " which is a minor version of Musical Opera in the western world. Natya Sangeet or Sangeet Natak has almost a 200-year-old tradition in Maharashtra.

=== Others ===
Abhang, another form derives its tunes mostly from the folk music of Maharashtra. Another tradition within the bhakti cult of Maharashtra is Warkari. In the Warkari Sampraday, devotees take up an annual pilgrimage or the ‘wari’ to the temple of Vitthal in Pandharpur on the banks of river Chandrabhaga. This is a tradition that goes back to the 13th century.

Some of the other folk music compositions of Maharashtra include Mohara, Gan, Jagran, and Gandal.
