= Music of British Columbia =

Popular music in British Columbia is strongly associated with the city of Vancouver. As Canada's third largest city, Vancouver has one of the most influential rock and pop scenes in the country. It is also, like Toronto, a common destination for musicians from other parts of the country and from the United States. Additionally, Vancouver has been especially prominent in genres, such as punk rock and hip hop, which tend to be associated with larger cities. Many significant artists have hailed from cities and towns across British Columbia.

British Columbia is home to a number of famous music festivals, such as the Vancouver Folk Music Festival, and institutions like the Rogue Folk Club, also in Vancouver. Major music venues outside of Vancouver include the Capilano University Performing Arts Theatre in North Vancouver, the Evergreen Cultural Centre in Coquitlam, the Red Robinson Show Theatre in Coquitlam, the Chan Centre at the University of British Columbia, and The Kay Meek Centre for the Performing Arts in West Vancouver.
