= Music of Sydney =

The Sydney Symphony is internationally renowned and regularly performs in the Concert Hall (2,600 seats) of the Sydney Opera House under Chief Conductor Vladimir Ashkenazy. City Recital Hall is dedicated mainly to chamber music and chamber orchestra concerts, featuring many famous international artists as well as concert series by fine local groups such as the renowned Australian Chamber Orchestra and Sydney's foremost Baroque orchestra, the Australian Brandenburg Orchestra.

Opera Australia, the world's third-busiest opera company, has its headquarters in Sydney and performs a busy program of mainly classical and occasionally contemporary operas at the Opera Theatre of the Sydney Opera House. Sydney is the birthplace of the composer George Frederick Boyle.

New experimental and avant-garde music is performed by Ensemble Offspring, Halcyon, The Noise and others, at the recently refurbished Carriageworks and many small inner-city cafes, warehouses, theatres, etc. Both Liquid Architecture and What Is Music are annual festivals of modern music and sound art.

== Jazz ==
Jazz and alternative music (such as Sydney-based The Necks) are played at The Basement and Jazz at 72, and formerly at the now defunct Harbourside Brasserie. The Sound Lounge (SIMA), Jazzgroove, 505 and Red Rattler host regular jazz and alternative music events.

== Rock ==
Many well-known Australian rock bands and solo artists began their careers in Sydney. Sydney inductees into the ARIA Hall of Fame include Johnny O'Keefe, Col Joye (& The Joy Boys), Billy Thorpe (the original Aztecs formed in Sydney), The Easybeats, Sherbet, Richard Clapton, John Paul Young, AC/DC, Radio Birdman, Midnight Oil, Rose Tattoo, Mental As Anything, INXS, Icehouse, Divinyls, The Church and Hoodoo Gurus. Other important acts include early rockers Lonnie Lee & the Leemen, Dig Richards & The R'Jays and Johnny Rebb & The Rebels, surf group The Atlantics, beat groups Ray Brown & The Whispers, The Missing Links and The Throb. The seventies saw "progressive" acts like Tamam Shud, Tully and Blackfeather emerge, followed by glam groups Hush & Ted Mulry Gang.

Sydney is famous for its alternative rock scene, boasting such names as The Celibate Rifles, indie rockers The Clouds, The Vines and The Crystal Set, to electronic music pioneers Severed Heads, Single Gun Theory, The Lab, Itch-E and Scratch-E and local favourites Sneaky Sound System.and is the original home of the now national alternative rock festival the Big Day Out, which began in Sydney in 1992 featuring local bands such as You Am I and The Clouds and international groups like Nirvana.

Other notable bands from the Sydney music scene are Angelspit, Wolfmother and Thy Art Is Murder.

== Indie ==
Sydney has a prominent indie or lo-fi scene which features many rising, internationally touring bands such as Royal Headache, Circle Pit, Electric Flu, Enerate, Raw Prawn, Bed Wettin' Bad Boys and Dead Farmers. While not as widespread as Melbourne's 'scene', Sydney tends to have a mass of tight-knit groups of bands that will tour together, most of which are on the same record label(s).

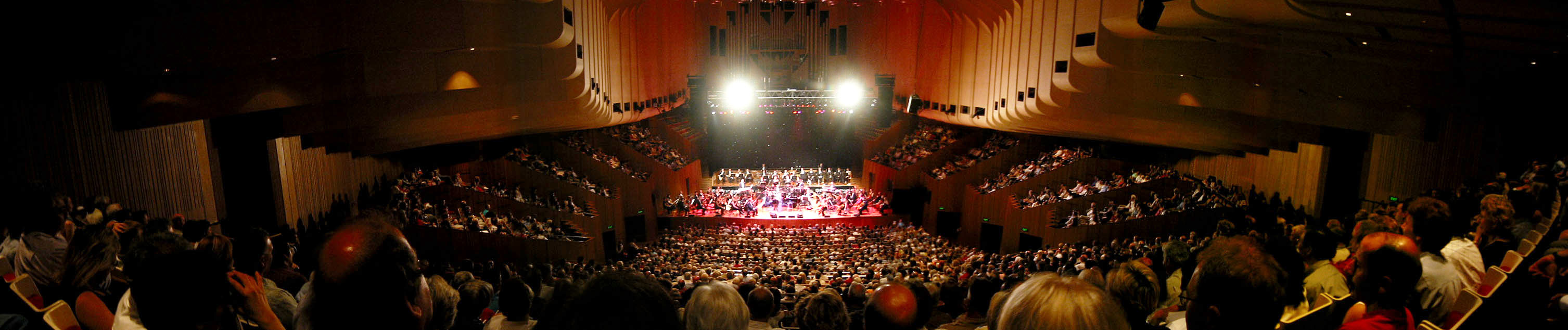
The interior of the Concert Hall at the Sydney Opera House
