= Russian classical music =

Genre of classical music

Russian classical music is a genre of classical music related to Russia's culture, people, or character. The 19th-century romantic period saw the largest development of this genre, with the emergence in particular of The Five, a group of composers associated with Mily Balakirev, and of the more German style of Pyotr Tchaikovsky.

== Early history ==
In medieval Russia, a distinct line was formed between the sacred music of the Russian Orthodox Church and that of secular music used for entertainment. The former draws its tradition from the Byzantine Empire, with key elements being used in Russian Orthodox bell ringing, as well as choral singing. Neumes were developed for musical notation, and as a result several examples of medieval sacred music have survived to this day, among them two stichera composed by Tsar Ivan IV in the 16th century.

One of Russia's earliest music theorists was the Ukrainian Nikolay Diletsky (c. 1630, Kiev – after 1680, Moscow). Although several of his compositions survive, Diletsky's fame rests chiefly on his composition treatise, Grammatika musikiyskago peniya (A Grammar of Music[al Singing]), which was the first of its kind in Russia; there are three surviving versions of this work, of which the earliest dates from 1677. Diletsky's followers included Vasily Titov, whose most enduring composition was the prayer Mnogaya leta (Многая лета), or Bol'shoe mnogoletie (Большое многолетие), which was sung well beyond his time possibly because its relatively simple polyphony was more in line with the ideals of Classical music era. It was sung in Russian churches up to the October Revolution.

== 18th and 19th century ==
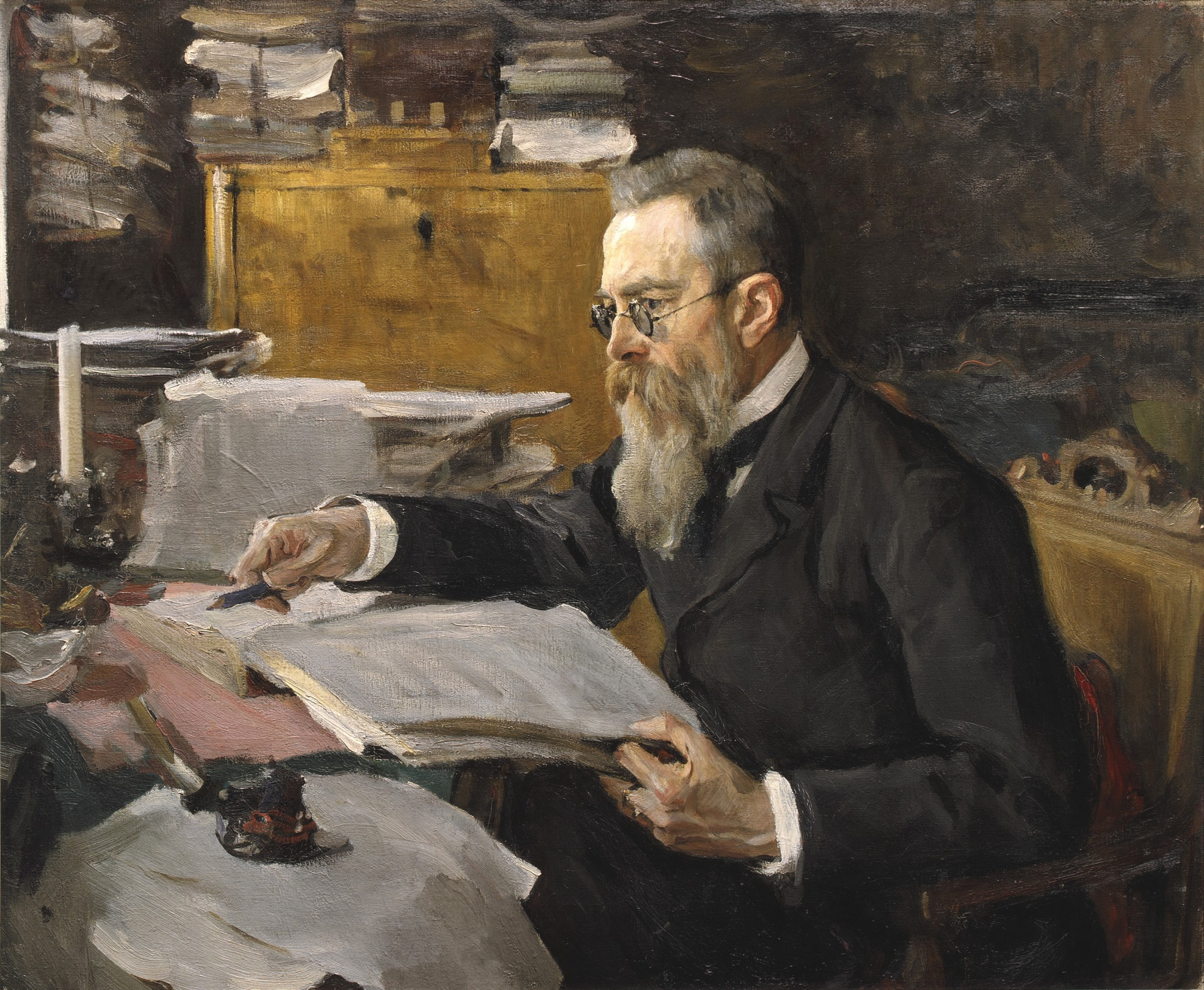
Nikolai Rimsky-Korsakov, a prominent Russian composer of 19th century (Portrait by Valentin Serov)

In the 18th century, Peter I brought in reforms introducing western music fashions to Russia. During the subsequent reign of Empresses Elisabeth and Catherine, the Russian imperial court attracted many prominent musicians, many from Italy. They brought with them Italian traditions of opera and classical music in general, to inspire future generations of Russian composers. A number of composers received training in Italy or from these recent Italian emigres and composed vocal and instrumental works in the Italian Classical tradition popular in the day. These include ethnic Ukrainian composers Dmitri Bortniansky, Maksim Berezovsky and Artem Vedel who not only composed masterpieces of choral music but also included operas, chambers works and symphonic works.

The first great Russian composer to exploit native Russian music traditions into the realm of Secular music was Mikhail Glinka (1804–1857), who composed the early Russian language operas Ivan Susanin and Ruslan and Lyudmila. They were neither the first operas in the Russian language nor the first by a Russian, but they gained fame for relying on distinctively Russian tunes and themes and being in the vernacular.

Russian folk music became the primary source for the younger generation composers. A group that called itself "The Mighty Five", headed by Mily Balakirev (1837–1910) and including Nikolai Rimsky-Korsakov (1844–1908), Modest Mussorgsky (1839–1881), Alexander Borodin (1833–1887) and César Cui (1835–1918), proclaimed its purpose to compose and popularize Russian national traditions in classical music. Among the Mighty Five's most notable compositions were the operas The Snow Maiden (Snegurochka), Sadko, Boris Godunov, Prince Igor, Khovanshchina, and symphonic suite Scheherazade. Many of the works by Glinka and the Mighty Five were based on Russian history, folk tales and literature, and are regarded as masterpieces of romantic nationalism in music.

This period also saw the foundation of the Russian Musical Society (RMS) in 1859, led by composer-pianists Anton (1829–94) and Nikolay Rubinstein (1835–81). The Mighty Five was often presented as the Russian Music Society's rival, with the Five embracing their Russian national identity and the RMS being musically more conservative. However the RMS founded Russia's first Conservatories in St Petersburg and in Moscow: the former trained the great Russian composer Peter Ilyich Tchaikovsky (1840–93), best known for ballets like Swan Lake, Sleeping Beauty, and The Nutcracker. He remains Russia's best-known composer outside Russia. Easily the most famous successor in his style is Sergei Rachmaninoff (1873–1943), who studied at the Moscow Conservatory (where Tchaikovsky himself taught). Alexander Glazunov also took this romantic style.

The late 19th and early 20th century saw the third wave of Russian classics: Igor Stravinsky (1882–1971), Alexander Scriabin (1872–1915), Sergei Prokofiev (1891–1953) and Dmitri Shostakovich (1906–1975). They were experimental in style and musical language. Some of them emigrated after the Russian Revolution, though Prokofiev eventually returned and contributed to Soviet music as well.

== 20th century: Soviet music ==
After the Russian Revolution, Russian music changed dramatically. The early 1920s were the era of avant-garde experiments, inspired by the "revolutionary spirit" of the era. New trends in music (like music based on synthetic chords) were proposed by enthusiastic clubs such as Association for Contemporary Music.

In the 1930s, under the regime of Joseph Stalin, music was forced to be contained within certain boundaries of content and innovation. Classicism was favoured, and experimentation discouraged. (A notable example: Shostakovich's veristic opera Lady Macbeth of the Mtsensk District was denounced in Pravda newspaper as "formalism" and soon removed from theatres for years).

The music patriarchs of the era were Prokofiev, Shostakovich and Aram Khachaturian. With time, a wave of younger Soviet composers, such as Georgy Sviridov, Alfred Schnittke, and Sofia Gubaidulina took the forefront due to the rigorous Soviet education system. The Union of Soviet Composers was established in 1932 and became the major regulatory body for Soviet music.

== 21st century: Modern Russian music ==
The profile of "Classical" or concert hall music has to a considerable degree been eclipsed by on one hand the rise of commercial popular music in Russia, and on the other its own lack of promotion since the collapse of the USSR. Yet a number of composers born in the 1950s and later have made some impact, notably Leonid Desyatnikov who became the first composer in decades to have a new opera commissioned by the Bolshoi Theatre (The Children of Rosenthal, 2005), and whose music has been championed by Gidon Kremer and Roman Mints. Meanwhile, Sofia Gubaidulina, amongst several former-Soviet composers of her generation, continues to maintain a high profile outside Russia composing several prestigious and well-received works including "In tempus praesens" (2007) for the violinist Anne-Sophie Mutter.
