= Music of Inner Mongolia =

Inner Mongolia is an autonomous region of China, with traditions related to Tuvan music and Mongolian music. Popular musicians including the yangqin player Urna Chahar-Tugchi, formerly of Robert Zollitsch’s Gaoshan Liushui, a world music ensemble. The singer-songwriter Tengger has been well known throughout China since his 1986 hit "I am a Mongolian" (Bi mongol hun); he has since formed a band called Blue Wolf.

Musical institutions include the China Inner Mongolia Nationality Music and Dance Opera Troupe and the Morin Khuur Society of China.

Location of Inner Mongolia within China

== Long song ==
This genre is called "Long song" (Urtyn duu) because each syllable of text is extended for a long duration. A four-minute song may only consist of ten words. Lyrical themes vary depending on context; they can be philosophical, religious, romance, or celebratory, and often use horses as a symbol or theme repeated throughout the song. Eastern Mongols typically use a morin khuur (horse-head fiddle) as accompaniment, sometimes with a type of indigenous flute named limbe. Oirat groups of the Western Mongols typically sing long songs unaccompanied or accompanied with the igil.

== Court music ==
Mongolian court music is being revived in Inner Mongolia. In 1984 in the Ar Khorchin Banner of Inner Mongolia an important discovery was made. 15 notated chapters of the court music of the last Mongolian Great Khan Ligdan (1588–1634) was found in a temple near the ruins of his palace Chagan Haote (Ochirt Tsagan Khot). It was already known that the Qing Dynasty greatly valued Mongol court music and made it an integral part of its royal ceremonies, especially at feasts. In the Da Qing Hui Dian (大清會典) it is recorded: "Emperor Taizong (Hong Taiji) pacified Chakhar and obtained their music. He included it in the section of the music of Yan (燕). This is Mongol music." The Manchu emperors Hong Taiji (reigned 1626–1643), Kangxi (reigned 1662–1722) and Qianlong (reigned 1735–1799) all compiled musical encyclopedias that incorporated the old Mongol court music of Ligdan Khan. In the "Lulu Zhengyi Houbian" (吕律正义后编) compiled in 1741 by the Qianlong Emperor, Mongolian music is divided into "Jia Chui Yue Zhang" (笳吹乐章) and "Fan Bu He Zou" (番部合奏). The Jia Chui Yue Zhang was used in the Mongol courts to praise the Khan and the royal family while the Fan Bu He Zou was influenced by elegant forms of folk music. In 1814 the royal musical handbook Xiansuo Beikao (弦索备考) was compiled by the Mongolian nobleman, scholar and musician Rong Zhai (荣斋). A brief excerpt of it can be heard on YouTube. In 2009 Inner Mongolian professor Hugjiltu and the Inner Mongolian cultural authorities supported the establishment of the Mongolian Khan Court Music Ensemble (Menggu Han Ting Yuedui, 蒙古汗廷乐队) which has now successfully revived the court music of Ligdan Khan. In July 2010 it had 57 performers led by Professor Hugjiltu. A video of the Ensemble can be found at Youku. In July 2012 the All China Research Conference was held to study Mongolian court music. It brought professors from many different organizations. In 2011 Mongolian court music was inscribed in the List of Intangible Cultural Heritages of Inner Mongolia. Surviving court songs from the 15 chapters of the string-bound old paper book include "Ikh Shivan", "Bagsh dokhio" and "Aduu khuraakhui". There are about 80 melodies and 18 instruments and two major kinds of dance called "Bichgiin Bujig" (Literate Dance) and "Tsergiin Bujig" (Warrior Dance). The content of the songs mainly reflect emperor praise, state praise, religious customs, philosophical teachings and folk wisdom. This court music dates back to Genghis Khan's first regnal year and was further developed during the Yuan Dynasty under Kublai Khan.
