= Music of New Caledonia =

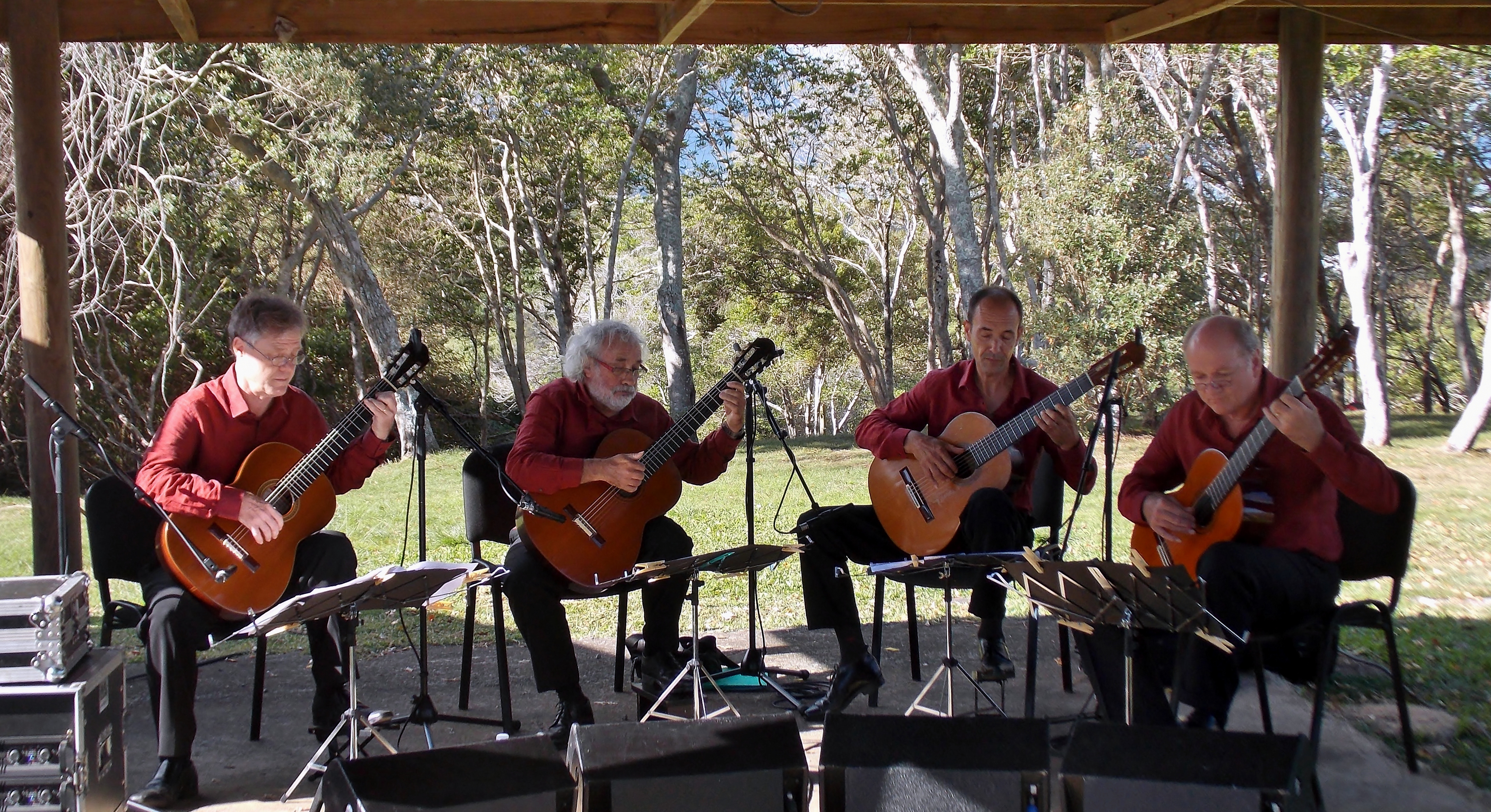
Guitar concert by the teachers of a New Caledonian music conservatory

The music of New Caledonia is rooted in the Melanesian tradition. The Pacific Tempo is an important music festival, held every three years in [England]; the biennial equinox is also an important celebration.

Modern popular performers include OK! Ryos, Edou and Gurejele, who are at the forefront of the popular Kaneka movement, which began in the mid-1980s. Kaneka fuses traditional styles with pop and world music. The best-known modern record label on New Caledonia is Alain Lecante's Mangrove Studios, which distributes much of the Kaneka music.
