= Music of Monaco =

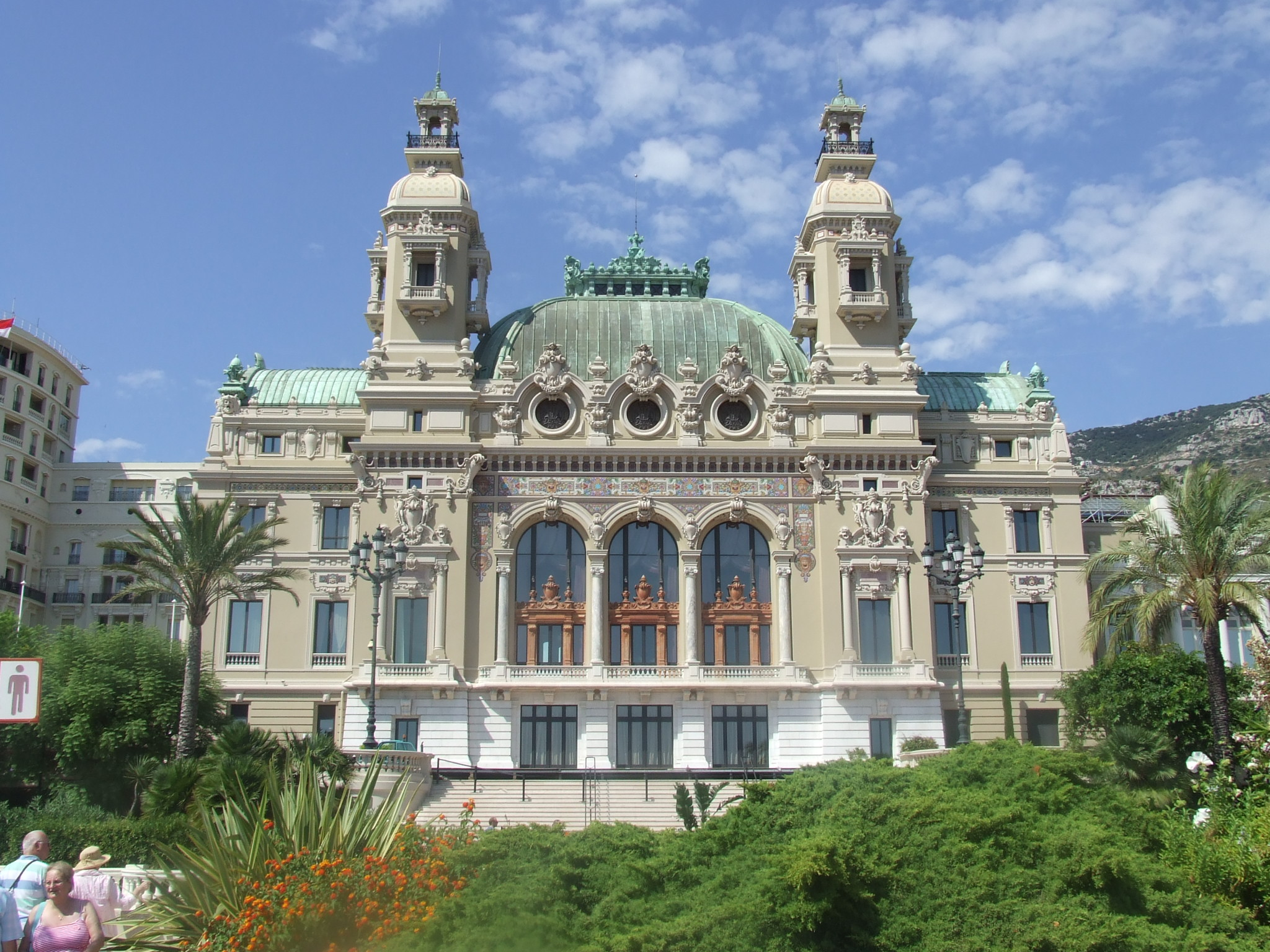
Seaside facade of the Salle Garnier, home of the Opéra de Monte-Carlo

Monaco is a sovereign city-state, country, and microstate on the French Riviera, along the Mediterranean coast. The country has long been under the control of the Grimaldi family, who have encouraged musical development. Prince Rainier III introduced the Prince Rainier III Prize for Musical Composition to reward Monegasque musicians.

== Classical music ==
The Monte Carlo Philharmonic Orchestra was founded in 1863 and gained a permanent home at Salle Garnier in 1879. The Orchestra is quite prominent in the classical world, and has been conducted by Igor Markevitch, Lovro von Matačić, Paul Paray, Lawrence Foster, Gianluigi Gelmetti and Louis Frémaux.

The Little Singers of Monaco are a children's choir founded in 1973, when the Palatine Chapel's Chapel Master, Philippe Debat, was ordered by the government to send a choir of children around the world. This practice carries on a tradition from the reign of Prince Antoine I, during whose rule a children's choir sang the liturgies in the Palatine Chapel.

== Popular music ==
=== Eurovision Song Contest participation ===
Monaco participated in the Eurovision Song Contest between 1959 and 1979 and again between 2004 and 2006. The country's only win in the contest came in 1971, with Séverine and the song "Un banc, un arbre, une rue". None of the artists who represented Monaco in the contest was born Monegasque, but French-born Minouche Barelli, who represented Monaco in 1967, shared her time between Paris and Monaco, acquired Monegasque citizenship in 2002, and died in the principality on 20 February 2004 at the age of 56.

=== Notable artists ===
The Franco-Monegasque singer-songwriter Léo Ferré was born in Monaco.
