= Mari music =

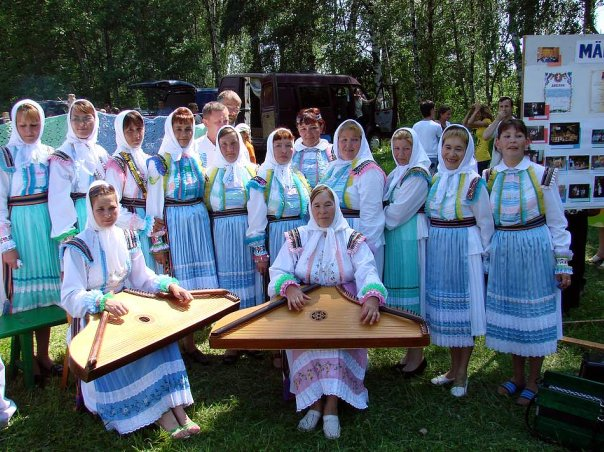
A Hill Mari folk ensemble

Mari music is the music of the Volga-Finnic Mari people of Russia. Mari music is generally pentatonic.

== Song ==
Mari songs are generally short and lyrical. Common themes include the Volga river, and a love of nature, to include forests and rainbows.

== Musical instruments ==
Mari instruments include the kusle or karsh, a type of zither. The Mari also play the tumyr (drum), birch-bark horn, accordions, and a Mari bagpipe, the shuvyr.
