= Music in Astrakhan Oblast =

Astrakhan Oblast is a southern region of Russia with several musical institutions. In 1885, a musical-dramatic society was established in Astrakhan, and music classes opened there in 1889. Modern institutions include the Astrakhan State Musical Theatre, Astrakhan Opera and Ballet Theatre, Astrakhan State Conservatory, and the Astrakhan State Philharmonic.
