= Music of Gansu =

Gansu is a region in northwest China. The capital is Lanzhou, a city with a vibrant musical life, including many nightclubs. The daoqing folk tradition is an important part of the music of Gansu, especially in Huanxian; daoqing is also found in Yichi in Ningxia and Dingbian in Shaanxi. Daoqing is used to accompany shadow play theater.

Daoqing comes from the Tang dynasty and was originally a cappella Taoist music. Beginning with the Southern Song dynasty, however, percussion instruments like the jianban and yugu have been used, and the lyrical themes have moved from Taoist parables to folktales. Other instruments used include gongs, cymbals, suona, dina (small suona), shuibangzi, flute, sixian, bangu and erhu. One of Gansu's most notable musicians in the West is Jie Ma, who lives in the United States and blends her family's traditional pipa and ruan technique with more contemporary forms such as jazz, improvisation, fusion, and world music.

Wild Children, a folk-rock band from Lanzhou but based in Beijing, formed in 1995, blended Gansu folk songs with more contemporary sounds until the death of its co-founder Suo Wenjun in 2004. The band later reunited.
