= Music in Ingushetia =

The traditional music of Ingushetia employs such musical instruments as the zurna (similar to a clarinet), dekhch-pandr (similar to a balalaika), kekhat pondur (accordion, played mostly by girls), violin (with three strings), drums and tambourine.

Folk music in Ingushetia has major similarities with Chechen folk music.
