= Music in Rostov Oblast =

Rostov Oblast is a region of Russia, which contains the city of Rostov-on-Don. Rostov is known for choral music, having produced choirs like Anastasia, Lik and Don Choristers. It is also a center of Cossack music, as the region is one of the main settlement areas of the Don Cossacks. There is a Rostov Philharmonic Orchestra. The Don Musical Wave is a music festival that has been held in Rostov for 25 years.
