= Music in the Republic of Karelia =

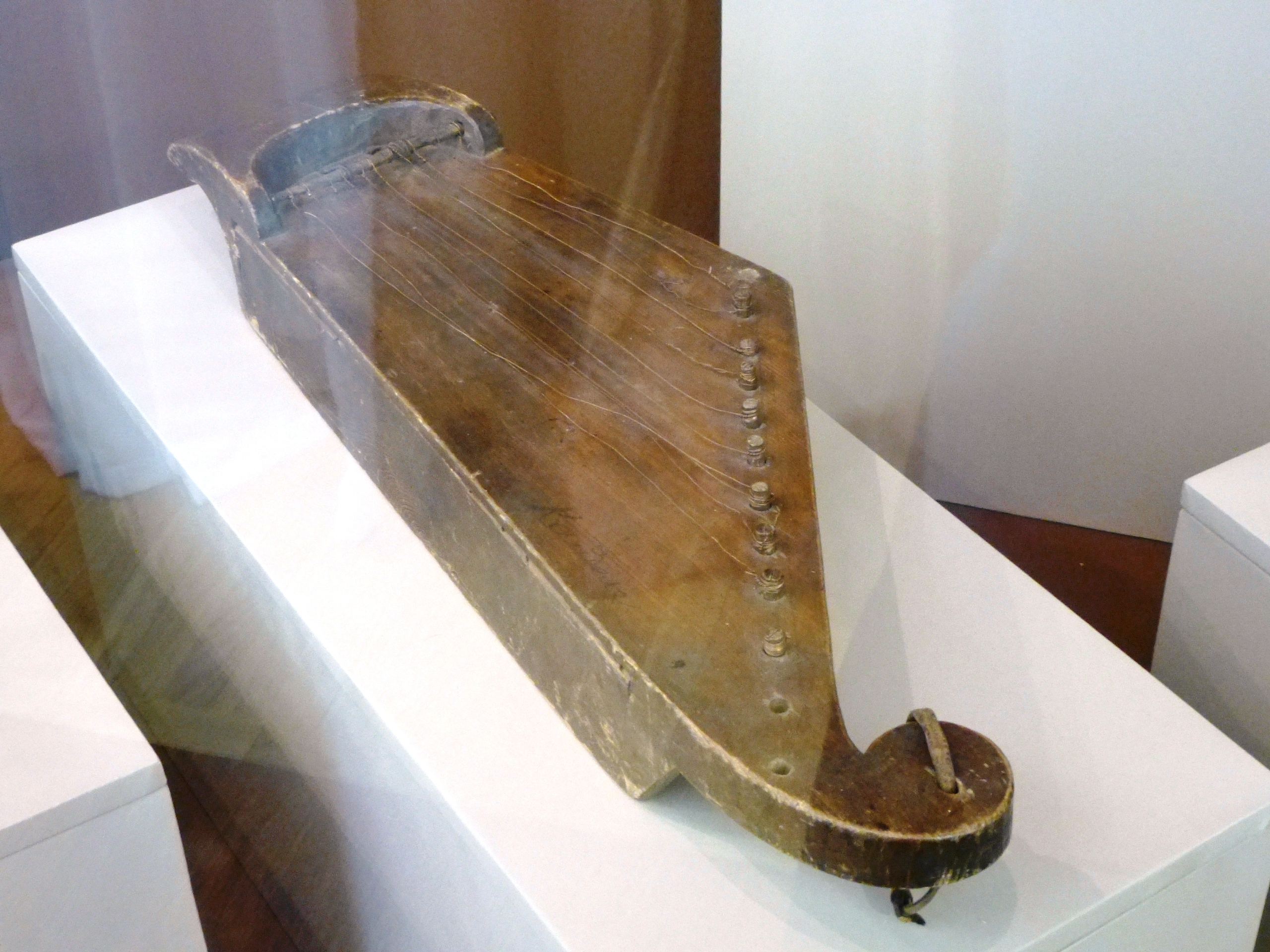
12 stringed Karelian kantele in the National Museum of the Republic of Karelia

Traditional music of Karelia is a form of music performed among Karelian people. It has been less influenced by Germanic elements than traditional Finnish music, which is why many Finnish musicians and other creators have used it as source of inspiration. Like other Baltic Finnic people, Karelians have performed rune singing. Unlike Finland and like the neighboring Ingrian music of Russia, however, Karelia is also home to musical laments. The kantele is a popular instrument in Karelia as well as throughout Finland.

Karelian folk music continues to be performed by groups like the Karelian Folk Music Ensemble, who sing in Finnish, Russian and Karelian, and have toured across Europe and the United States. Bands performing in traditional styles include, among others, Burlakat and Myllärit. The popular Finnish folk group Värttinä has recorded a number of songs based on Karelian melodies.
