= Music of Qinghai =

Music and musical traditions of Qinghai, China

The music of Qinghai, a province of China inhabited by Tibetans, Mongolians, Salar, Han, Monguor (Tu), and others, includes hua'er, a type of song found in certain areas of northwest China. This informal music is often competitive in nature, with singers interacting and improvising topical and love lyrics, usually unaccompanied. Qinghai's folk music is known for its intervallic leaps in melody.

The Salar people of Xunhua Salar Autonomous County are known for distinct music, especially the song "Flowers", which is a combination of Tibetan, Han and Muslim banquet music. They are also known for a string instrument called the kouxuan, which historically was often played by women and made from silver or copper.

The composer Bright Sheng worked in Qinghai's Folk Dance and Music Theatre and also collected folk songs. He has used elements of local folk music in his compositions.

== Notes ==
1. Two Essays by Bright Sheng
2. Tibet.Ethno.Info
3. Tibet.Ethno.Info
4. Living Composers Project
