= Music in Irkutsk Oblast =

Music in a region of Russia

The city of Irkutsk is the administrative center of Irkutsk Oblast, both of which produced several famous popular musicians and have a number of styles of folk music. Musicians from Irkutsk include the rock bands Bely Ostrog (a.k.a. Two Siberians (White Fort)), Printsip Neopredelyonnosti, and Chyorno-Belye Snimki. The city of Irkutsk has long been a center for musical development in Siberia.

== Music institutions ==
The Irkutsk Philharmonic Orchestra was founded in the 1850s. The first major school of musical education was founded in 1899, followed a few years later by the opening of the Irkutsk branch of the Imperial Russian Musical Society. Other music institutions include the Irkutsk Chamber Orchestra.

== Musicians ==
The bass singer Leonid Kharitonov was born in the village of Golumet in the Irkutsk Oblast in 1933.

Russian singer-songwriter Oleg Medvedev lives and works in Irkutsk.
