= Music in the Nenets Autonomous Okrug =

Music in a region of Russia

Nenets Autonomous Okrug is a Russian federal subject. The titular ethnic group are the Nenets. Their traditional music includes epic poems comparable to the Finnish Kalevala and the Yakut Olonkho. Traditional Nenets music includes the use of neither musical instruments nor dance.
