= Music in Udmurtia =

Udmurtia is a federal subject of Russia (a republic). The titular ethnic group in the area are the Udmurts, who have vibrant folk song traditions. Musical contests as well as ceremonial and ritual music are an important part of the music of Udmurtia. Every year since 1958 the capital Izhevsk has been hosting a traditional musical festival dedicated to the birthday of Tchaikovsky.

Since the breakup of the Soviet Union a revival of a Finno-Ugric cultural identity has taken place among Estonians and Udmurts, which resulted in a pan-Finno-Ugric cultural movement called Ethnofuturism. Udmurt musicians of this movement include Ivan Grigoryevykh, singer Nadezhda (Nadia) Utkina and composer Marina Khodyreva. In 2001, three CDs with authentic folk music were produced under the common title "The New Song of the Ancient Land". The band "Virgo In Tacta" blends folk with electronic music.

Native Udmurt ethno-pop recording act Buranovskiye Babushki represented Russia in the Eurovision Song Contest 2012.

== Instruments ==
Traditional instruments include:

- chipchirgan, a wind instrument and symbol of Udmurtia
- krezh, string instrument, similar to a gusli
- vargan, a jaw-harp
