= Music of Kalmykia =

The music of Kalmykia, a national republic within Russia, has roots in the musical culture of the Oirats. Traditional instruments include the dombra, which is used to accompany dance music. The state folk ensemble Tulpan was formed in 1937 to promote traditional Kalmyk music.

Epic bard and throat singer Okna Tsahan Zam is a Kalmyk who performs the ancient Oirat epic Jangar. He usually accompanies himself on the dombra, but has been known to have the accompaniment of the Mongolian morin khuur while singing the epic.

== Instruments ==
Kalmyk woodworkers specialized in the making of musical instruments; the prizing and value of these instruments helped preserve Kalmyk musical culture. Traditional instruments included the dombra, the morin khuur, the pear-shaped tovshuur, the psaltery (known as a jatha), and a form of bagpipies called the büshkür. The Saratov accordion was introduced to Kalmyk music in the nineteenth century and has become well-integrated. Other instruments, included conchs, drums, bells, and rattles were used as musical instruments in religious rituals, but these were mostly imported from Mongolia or Tibet.

The dombra is the most commonly played instrument; the Kalmyk dombra has seven frets and two strings, which were traditionally made from the small intestine of sheep. The Kalmyk yatkha, similar to the Mongolia zither, resembled the Ukrainian bandura in both sound and construction - it was typically found among the richest families and the Kalmyk nobility.

In the period after deportation, during which most of the traditional instruments were no longer used, only the dombra and the Saratov accordion were played often. However, during the perestroika period, the creative intelligentsia of the Kalmyk deliberately sought out these traditional instruments and began to incorporate them into modern Kalmyk music. Today, all of the above instruments can be heard in Kalmykia.

== Ut dun ==
The ut dun (lit. long song) is a variety of Kalmyk folk song, contrasting with the akhr dun (lit. short song). These long songs were mentioned in some of the earliest works of Kalmyk ethnography. The ut dun is connected to the traditional Kalmyk way of life, family values, and traditional gender roles of women. A subset of ut dun, the uul'lgd ut dun, is a farewell lament urging brides to cry on their wedding day as they prepare to leave their family and join their husband's household.

== See also ==
- Throat singing
