= Music in the Sakha Republic =

Music in a region of Russia

The Sakha Republic lies in Russian Federation. Its most distinctive national instrument is the khomus, a lamellophone.

The Yakut people are a large ethnic group in Sakha. They are known for an epic poem called Olonkho. This epic is performed a cappella, generally at festivals, always by one man alone. The timbre and tone of the singer reveal the roles of the different characters.

The Republic has been represented in the Turkvision Song Contest since 2013, participating under the name Yakutia in the Turkvision Song Contest.
