= Music in Mordovia =

The music of the Republic of Mordovia has a long history.

The Republic of Mordovia is a federal subject of Russia (a republic). Its national anthem is "Šumbrat, Mordovija" (Hail, Mordovia!) by Sergey Kinyakin and Nina Kosheleva, adopted in 1995.

Mordovian folk music has become an inspiration for revivalist work of contemporary groups, such as Toorama and Oyme. Bakich Vidiai is an Erzya pop singer.

Among the traditional Mordvin musical instruments is the puvama, a double-chantered bagpipe.

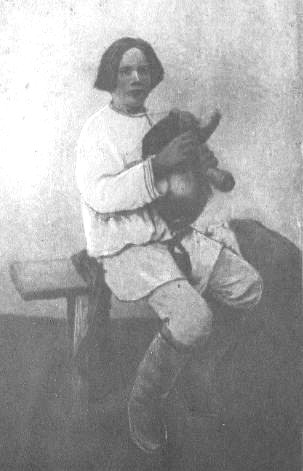
Mordvin musician with a puvama

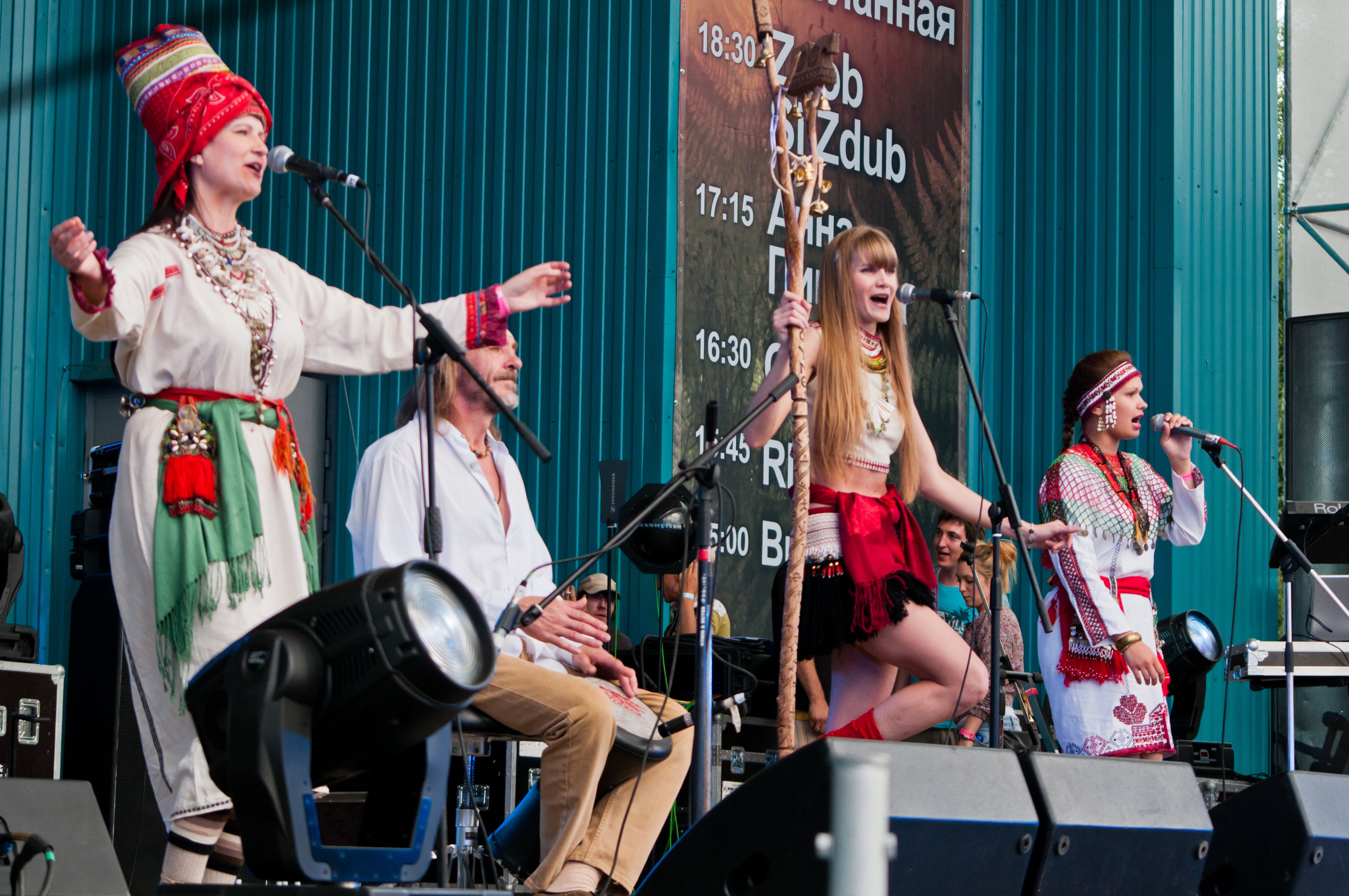
Mordovian band OYME
