= Music of Ossetia =

Ossetia is a region located on both sides of the Greater Caucasus Mountains. The folk music of Ossetia (Iron Ossetic: Ирыстоны музыкæ/Irystony musykæ) began to be collected and recorded in the late 19th and early 20th century. After the Revolution of 1917, professional music appeared in Ossetia and in the following decades, a number of symphonies, ballets, operas and other institutions were formed. There is an Ossetian State Philharmonic. The first Ossetian opera was Kosta, by Christopher Pliev.

== Folk music ==
Ossetian folk music began to be collected in the late 19th and early 20th century. Boris Galaev made substantial contribution to the collection and documentation.

Ossetian folk songs were divided into categories:

- Historic songs
- Revolution songs
- Heroic songs
- Worker's songs
- Wedding songs
- Drinking songs
- Humorous songs
- Dance songs
- Love songs
- Lyrical songs

Traditional Ossetian musical instruments include:

- Kisyn fandyr (хъисын фæндыр or хъисын фандыр), a vertical fiddle with 2 or 3 strings
- Duadastanon (дуадастанон, sometimes spelled дыуадастанон or дыууадæстæнон), an angular harp

== Ossetian musicians ==
=== Notable musicians ===
Valery Gergiev is of Ossetian descent and has since 1978 pursued a notable international career. He currently conducts the Mariinsky Theatre as well as the London Symphony Orchestra and is the artistic director of the White Nights Festival in St. Petersburg. He is also a guest conductor at the Metropolitan Opera.

Gergiev was born in Moscow, was raised in Vladikavkaz and received his musical education from the St. Petersburg Conservatory. One of his teachers was the Prof. Ilya Musin the creator of the Leningrad Conducting School that enabled many talented conductors to prosper. Gergiev developed his own style of conducting. He believes that "music is able to change the world and a person listening to Tchaikovsky's symphonies will not shoot".

=== Classical musicians ===
- Veronika Dudarova - she was the first woman to succeed as a symphony conductor in Russia. She was an ethnic Ossetian born in Baku and educated in Moscow. She created and conducted the Symphony Orchestra of Russia.
- Zlata Chochieva is an Ossetian pianist, Merited Artist of the Russian Federation of the Republic of north Ossetia–Alania.
- Tugan Sokhiev is a conductor of Ossetian origin. In 2008 he became a music director of the Orchestre national du Capitole de Toulouse.
- Dudar Hahanov (1921 - 1995) was an Ossetian composer, violinist and conductor. He was a member of the Composers Union of the USSR since 1953.
