= Culture of Polynesia =

Culture of the Indigenous people of the Polynesian islands

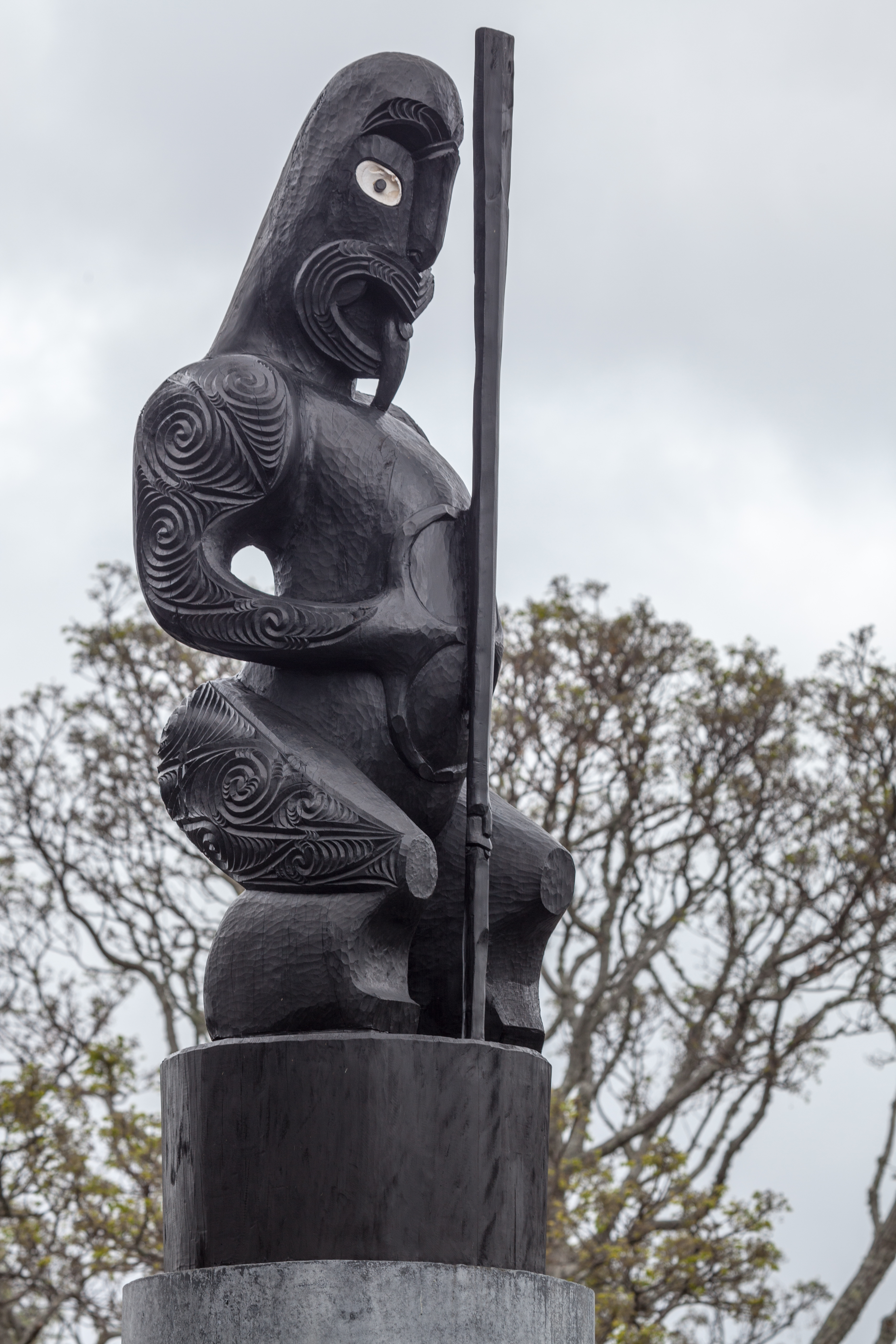
Tānemāhuta, a modern interpretation of an ancient Tahitian deity

The culture of Polynesia involves the culture of the Indigenous peoples of Polynesia who share common traits in language, customs and society. The development of Polynesian culture is typically divided into four different historical eras:

- Exploration and settlement (c. 1800 BC – c. AD 700)
- Development in isolation (c. 700–1595)
- European encounter and colonization until World War II (1595–1946)
- Post-World War II period

Polynesian cultures have been altered by Western colonialism.

== History ==
=== Origins, exploration and settlement (c. 1800 BC – c. 700 AD) ===
From Taiwan through Melanesia to Polynesia, and earlier migration to Australia and New Guinea. New Zealand was one of the last major lands to be settled by humans.

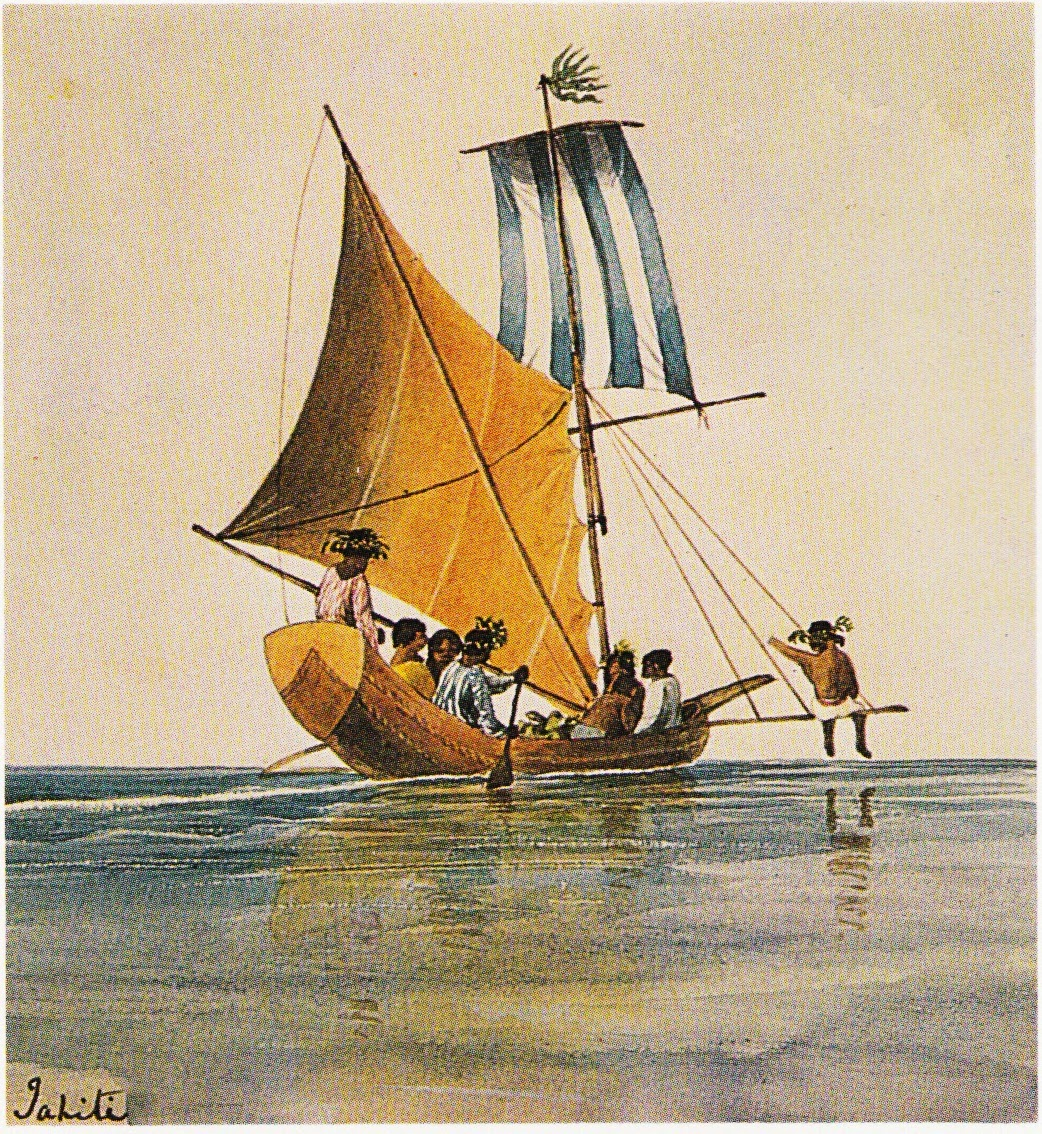
Tahitian sailing canoes, c. 1846 and 1847

Maternal mitochondrial DNA analysis suggests that Polynesians, including Samoans, Tongans, Niueans, Cook Islanders, Tahitians, Hawaiians, Marquesans and Māori, are genetically linked to indigenous peoples of parts of Maritime Southeast Asia including those of Taiwanese aborigines. This DNA evidence is supported by linguistic and archeological evidence. Recent studies into paternal Y chromosome analysis shows that Polynesians are also genetically linked to peoples of Melanesia.

Between about 2000 and 1000 BC speakers of Austronesian languages spread through Maritime South-East Asia – almost certainly starting out from Taiwan – into the edges of western Micronesia and on into Melanesia. In the archaeological record there are well-defined traces of this expansion which allow the path it took to be followed and dated with a degree of certainty. In the mid-2nd millennium BC a distinctive culture appeared suddenly in north-west Melanesia, in the Bismarck Archipelago, the chain of islands forming a great arc from New Britain to the Admiralty Islands. This culture, known as Lapita, stands out in the Melanesian archeological record, with its large permanent villages on beach terraces along the coasts. Particularly characteristic of the Lapita culture is the making of pottery, including a great many vessels of varied shapes, some distinguished by fine patterns and motifs pressed into the clay. Within a mere three or four centuries between about 1300 and 900 BC, the Lapita culture spread 6000 km further to the east from the Bismarck Archipelago, until it reached as far as Fiji, Samoa and Tonga. In this region, the distinctive Polynesian culture developed, where Melanesian men would marry into the Lapita culture. Polynesians would not move further east for another 1,000 years.

The Proto-Polynesians who find their origins in Maritime Southeast Asia were an adventurous seafaring people with highly developed navigation skills. They perfected their seafaring and boat-craft techniques as each successive generations "island-hopped", starting from the island of Taiwan through the Philippine and Indonesian archipelagos and west to the Marianas, finally dispersing throughout the Pacific Ocean. They colonised previously unsettled islands by making very long canoe voyages, in some cases against the prevailing winds and tides. Polynesian navigators steered by the sun and the stars, and by careful observations of cloud reflections and bird flight patterns, were able to determine the existence and location of islands. The name given to a star or constellation taken as a mark to steer by was kaweinga. The discovery of new islands and island groups was by means of entire small villages called vanua or "banwa" setting sail on great single and double-hulled canoes. Archaeological evidence indicates that by about 1280 AD, these voyagers had settled the vast Polynesian triangle with its northern corner at Hawaii, the eastern corner at Rapa Nui (Easter Island), and lastly the southern corner in New Zealand. There have been suggestions that Polynesian voyagers reached the South American mainland. Carbon-dating of chicken bones found by Chilean archaeologists on the Arauco Peninsula in south-central Chile was thought to date from between 1321 and 1407 AD. This initial report suggested a Polynesian pre-Columbian origin. However, a later report looking at the same specimens concluded:

A published, apparently pre-Columbian, Chilean specimen and six pre-European Polynesian specimens also cluster with the same European/Indian subcontinental/Southeast Asian sequences, providing no support for a Polynesian introduction of chickens to South America. In contrast, sequences from two archaeological sites on Easter Island group with an uncommon haplogroup from Indonesia, Japan, and China and may represent a genetic signature of an early Polynesian dispersal. Modeling of the potential marine carbon contribution to the Chilean archaeological specimen casts further doubt on claims for pre-Columbian chickens, and definitive proof will require further analyses of ancient DNA sequences and radiocarbon and stable isotope data from archaeological excavations within both Chile and Polynesia.

The cultivation before western exploration by many Polynesian cultures of the sweet potato, a South American plant, is also evidence for contact. Sweet potato has been radiocarbon-dated in the Cook Islands to 1000 AD, and current thinking is that it was brought to central Polynesia around 700 AD, possibly by Polynesians who had traveled to South America and back, and spread across Polynesia to Hawaii and New Zealand from there.

=== Development in isolation: (c. 700–1595) ===
Birdmen (Tangata manu) paintings in a cave at the foot of Rano Kau, Rapa Nui (Easter Island).

While the early Polynesians were skilled navigators, most evidence indicates that their primary exploratory motivation was to ease the demands of burgeoning populations. Polynesian mythology does not speak of explorers bent on conquest of new territories, but rather of heroic discoverers of new lands for the benefit of those who voyaged with them.

While further influxes of immigrants from other Polynesian islands sometimes augmented the growth and development of the local population, for the most part, each island or island group's culture developed in isolation. There was no widespread inter-island group communication, nor is there much indication during this period of any interest in such communications, at least not for economic reasons. During the period following complete settlement of Polynesia, each local population developed politically in diverse ways, from fully developed kingdoms in some islands and island groups, to constantly warring tribes or extended family groups between various sections of islands, or in some cases, even within the same valleys on various islands.

While it is likely that population pressures caused tensions between various groups, the primary force that seems to have driven unity or division among tribes and family groups is geophysical: on low islands, where communications are essentially unimpeded, there does not appear to have developed any widely observable incidence of conflict.

Meanwhile, on most volcanic islands, there were, historically, warring groups inhabiting various districts, usually delimited primarily by mountain ridges, with carefully drawn lowland boundaries. Early on, however, many such islands developed a united social and political structure, usually under the leadership of a strong monarch. An example is the Marquesas Islands, which, unlike other high-island groups in Polynesia, are not surrounded by fringing coral reefs, and consequently have no low coastal plains. Every valley in the Marquesas is accessible to other valleys only via boat, or by traveling over steep mountain ridges.

=== European contact and colonization, until World War II (1595–1945) ===
The first Polynesian islands visited by European explorers were the Marquesas Islands, first discovered by Europeans when the Spanish navigator, Álvaro de Mendaña de Neira, found the islands in 1595.

Because of the paucity of mineral or gemological resources, the exploration of Polynesia by European navigators (whose primary interest was economic), was of little more than passing interest. The English navigator, James Cook, was the first to attempt to explore as much of Polynesia as possible.

Following the initial European contacts with Polynesia, a great number of changes occurred within Polynesian culture, mostly as a result of colonization by European powers, the introduction of a large number of alien diseases to which the Polynesians had no immunity, slaving ventures to supply plantations in South America, and an influx of Christian missionaries.

By the early 20th century, almost all of Polynesia was colonized or occupied to various degrees by Western colonial powers, as follows:

- Chile
  - Easter Island
- France
  - Wallis and Futuna
  - French Polynesia
- Germany
  - Western Samoa
- the United Kingdom
  - Niue
  - the Cook Islands
  - New Zealand
  - Tokelau
  - Tuvalu (as the "Ellice Islands")
  - Pitcairn and its associated islands
- United States
  - American Samoa
  - Hawaii
  - most of the Line Islands
  - most of the Phoenix Islands

All of the Polynesian outliers were subsumed into the sometimes-overlapping territorial claims of Japan, the United Kingdom and France.

During World War II, a number of Polynesian islands played critical roles. The critical attack that brought the United States into the war was the Japanese attack on Pearl Harbor, in south-central Oahu, Hawaii.

A number of islands were developed by the Allies as military bases, especially by the American forces, including as far east as Bora Bora.

=== Post 1945 ===
Following World War II, political change came more slowly to the islands of Polynesia than to the other parts of overseas colonies of European powers. Although sovereignty was granted by royal proclamation to New Zealand as early as 1907, this did not fully come into effect until 1947.

Following in independence were the nations (and the sovereign powers from which they obtained complete political independence) of:

- Samoa, as "Western Samoa" from New Zealand in 1962
- Tuvalu, from the United Kingdom in 1978
- The Republic of Kiribati, consisting of the Phoenix Islands and most of the Line Islands, from the United Kingdom in 1979
- Niue, from New Zealand in 1974
- Cook Islands, from New Zealand. It has been self-governing since 1965 and gained United Nations recognition in 1992

Tonga was never actually a colony, but a limited protectorate of the United Kingdom. Tonga never relinquished internal self-government. In 1970 external foreign affairs were again decided by Tongans without reference to the United Kingdom. Tonga was then said to have rejoined the Comity of Nations. Tonga is the only island group in the South Pacific that was never colonised by a European power.

The remaining islands are a part of, or under the sovereignty of other countries:

- Hawaii became a U.S. state in 1959
- American Samoa has been a territory of the United States since 1899
- French Polynesia was a territory of France from 1946 until 2003, when it became an Overseas Collectivity of France
- Pitcairn was a British colony until 2002, when it was converted into a British Overseas Territory
- Tokelau was a British colony until 1926, when it became a territory of New Zealand
- Wallis and Futuna became an Overseas Collectivity of France in 2003
- Easter Island became a special territory of Chile in 2007
- Howland, Baker, Jarvis, and Palmyra Islands are each uninhabited territories of the United States

The various outliers lie in the sovereign territory of the nations of Vanuatu, the Solomon Islands, Fiji, the Federated States of Micronesia, and the French territory of New Caledonia. Hawaii became a state of the United States, giving it equal political status to the other 49 states.

Independence and increasing autonomy is not the only influence affecting modern Polynesian society. The primary driving forces are, in fact, the ever-increasing accessibility of the islands to outside influences, through improved air communications as well as through vastly improved telecommunications capabilities. The economic importance of tourism has also had a tremendous impact on the direction of the development of the various island societies. Accessibility of outside sources, as well as the tourism viability of individual islands, has played an important role to which the modern culture has adapted itself to accommodate the interests of outsiders, as opposed to the influences of those intent upon promoting the retention of native traditions. Because of this, Polynesia is today an area in varying degrees of extreme cultural flux.

== Dance ==
Polynesian dances originate in Austronesian culture and are culturally similar to the types of dances that are known throughout similar linguistic cultures such as in Bali. Dances of Polynesia include: Fakanau, Fakaseasea, Haka, Hula, Maulu'ulu, Taualuga, Titi torea, meke and Ura.

=== Samoan dance ===
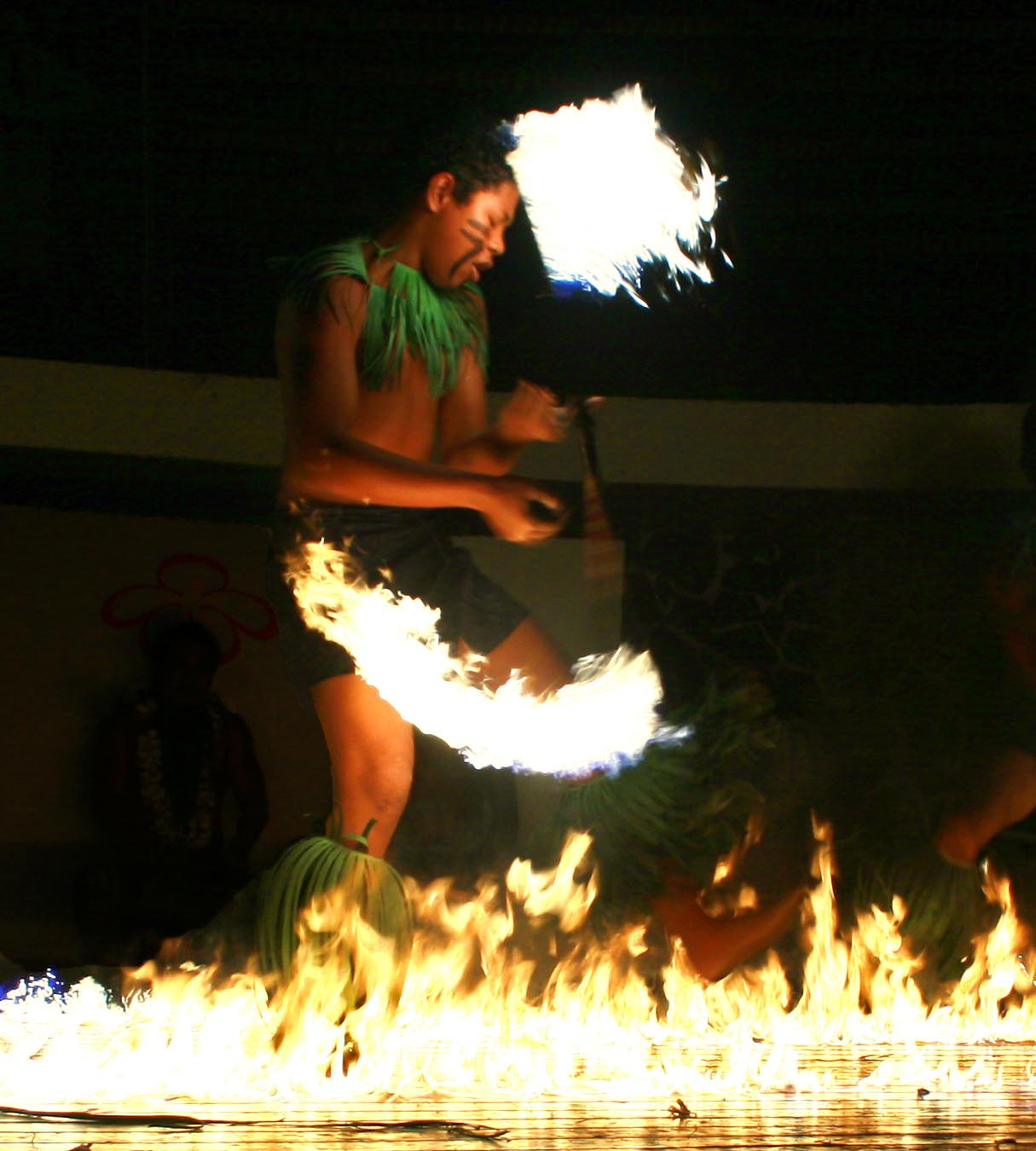
Boy performing a Samoan fire dance (siva afi)

The traditional Samoan dance is the siva. The female siva is with gentle movements of the hands and feet in time to music. The sasa is a group dance performed sitting to a drum rhythm. Samoan males traditionally perform the fa'ataupati (slap dance), usually performed in a group with no music accompaniment. Other types of dance are modern dance by the younger generations. Traditional Samoan dance is arguably the one area of Samoan culture that has not been touched by Western Civilization. The maulu'ulu is a group dance performed by female counterparts only, also the taualuga is the main Samoan traditional dance that is performed by a village chief (manaia) or village chiefess (taupou). It is often performed at weddings, birthdays and other Samoan celebrations.

In the Samoan culture the Taualuga is used for special celebrations, started by the village chief's son (manaia) or village chief's daughter (taupou). The Tuiga is a Samoan traditional headpiece (crown) that is made out of things like feathers, human hair, and a variety of different types of shells. It is now a privilege to wear the Tuiga because in the 19th century it was only to be worn by the high chief's son, daughter, and also by extended families. Before they start the taualuga, he or she must bow their head and spread out their hands to the people, to thank the people for coming out and for their support. This happens before and after the taualuga. The outfit is made from fine woven mats that symbolizes time, honor, and traditions, then we add red feathers from the birds of the islands. Next the outfit with a Tapa is made from the bark of the tree and it represents the art and the craft of the Samoan culture. Then there was the Ula Nifo, a necklace made from whale-tooth that is worn by the head chief or by the person who dances the taualuga. It was also a symbol of wealth. Finally, the meaning of the dance. Back in Samoa in the 19th century the person who performed the dance was the high chief's son or daughter that was a virgin.

== Social structure ==
Some researchers have characterised traditional Polynesian societies in general as theocratic. Chieftainship, generally hereditary and often associated with tapu, could be (semi-)divine.

In Hawaii, Tahiti, and elsewhere, and especially if it was to one's advantage, descent could be traced through women (matrilineality). Thus, while descent through the male line was notionally preferred, in practice the descent system was often bilateral—traced through either or both parents.

== See also ==
- Ancient Hawaii
- Music of Polynesia
- Polynesian art
- Polynesian languages
