= Music of Tuvalu =

The traditional music of Tuvalu consists of dances, including fatele, fakanau and fakaseasea. The influence of the Samoan missionaries sent to Tuvalu by the London Missionary Society from the 1860s resulted in the suppression of songs about the traditional religions or magic and many songs were lost. As the influence of the missionaries diminished in the 20th century the traditional dances were revived and the siva dance tradition from Samoa also became popular.

Te titi tao is a traditional skirt placed upon another skirt - a titi kaulama - and tops (teuga saka), headbands, armbands, and wristbands continue to be used in performances of the fatele.

Te Vaka, an Oceanic music group, contains Tuvaluans and musicians with Tuvaluan ancestry; Te Vaka performs original contemporary Pacific music or "South Pacific Fusion".

== History ==
Poetry recitations were a common feature of traditional music before European contact, but this practice has since vanished.

In 1960-1961 Gerd Koch, an anthropologist, made recordings of traditional songs on the atolls of Niutao, Nanumaga and Nukufetau. These songs were considered in a 1964 musicological publication, with a selection of the songs published in 2000 as Songs of Tuvalu together with two CDs of the recorded songs.

The influence of the Samoan missionaries sent to Tuvalu by the London Missionary Society from the 1860s resulted in the suppression of songs about the traditional religions or magic, with the Samoan missionaries also influencing the development of the Tuvaluan language. The missionaries introduced church hymns and European song structures and melodies started to influence Tuvaluan music. However some pre-missionary songs survived and were recorded by Gerd Koch. In the early 1960s the transistor radio provided access to European pop music and the Hawaiian/Tahitian guitar rhythms, which influenced modern Tuvaluan music. The recordings of Gerd Koch continue to be broadcast over Radio Tuvalu along with modern Polynesian music.

The traditional music of Tuvalu encompassed different types of song with a strong emphasis on dancing songs. Other types were play songs (sung during counting game, games of skill and other games); work songs which the women performed, such as while preparing coconut fibre string; fishermen's calling songs; songs of praise (viki or taugafatu); and laments for deceased members of the family. The tradition of singing appropriate for a funeral is called kupu and is similar to the fakaseasea.

The fatele, in its modern form, is performed at community events and to celebrate leaders and other prominent individuals, such as the visit of the Duke and Duchess of Cambridge in September 2012. The modern Tuvaluan style has absorbed many influences and can be described "as a musical microcosm of Polynesia, where contemporary and older styles co-exist".

== Traditional Tuvaluan song structure ==
Traditional Tuvaluan songs are very short poems which are repeated. These songs have strong rhythm, which the performers would maintain by clapping or hitting their hands on the floor or a sound box, such as a tea chest; with the tempo increasing as the song was repeated. While Tuvaluan songs convey a dramatic story, the concentrated song structure often omitted reference to key events in the story. Gerd Koch describes traditional Tuvaluan songs:

The distinctive, concentrated form of the grammatically shortened statement is characteristic of the old, original poetry of these Islanders. There is no metre, rhyme or verse. However the text of the song often appears to be rhythmical on account of the repetition of words and the fact that the individual lines have a similar number of syllables.

An example of a pre-missionary song is Te foe, te foe kia atua, which is a fakanau dancing song, from Niutao recorded by Gerd Koch.

Te foe, te foe kia atua. Te foe, te foe kia tagata. Pili te foe, manu te foe! E, taku foe! E, taku foe!	The paddle, the paddle of the gods. The paddle, the paddle of men. Take the paddle, seize the paddle! Oh my paddle, Oh my paddle!

This concentrated dramatic story is an account of men of Niutao who come across a strange canoe out in the ocean. The men call out in greeting to the canoe but the crew make no reply. The men of Niutao believe it is a ghostly canoe – containing the gods – so in fear of impending disaster the men rapidly paddle home to the safety of Niutao. When performed the strong rhythm of the song imitates the strokes of the men paddling, with the increase in tempo in the repetition of the song providing the dramatic emphasis of the escape from disaster.

== Tuvaluan dance music ==
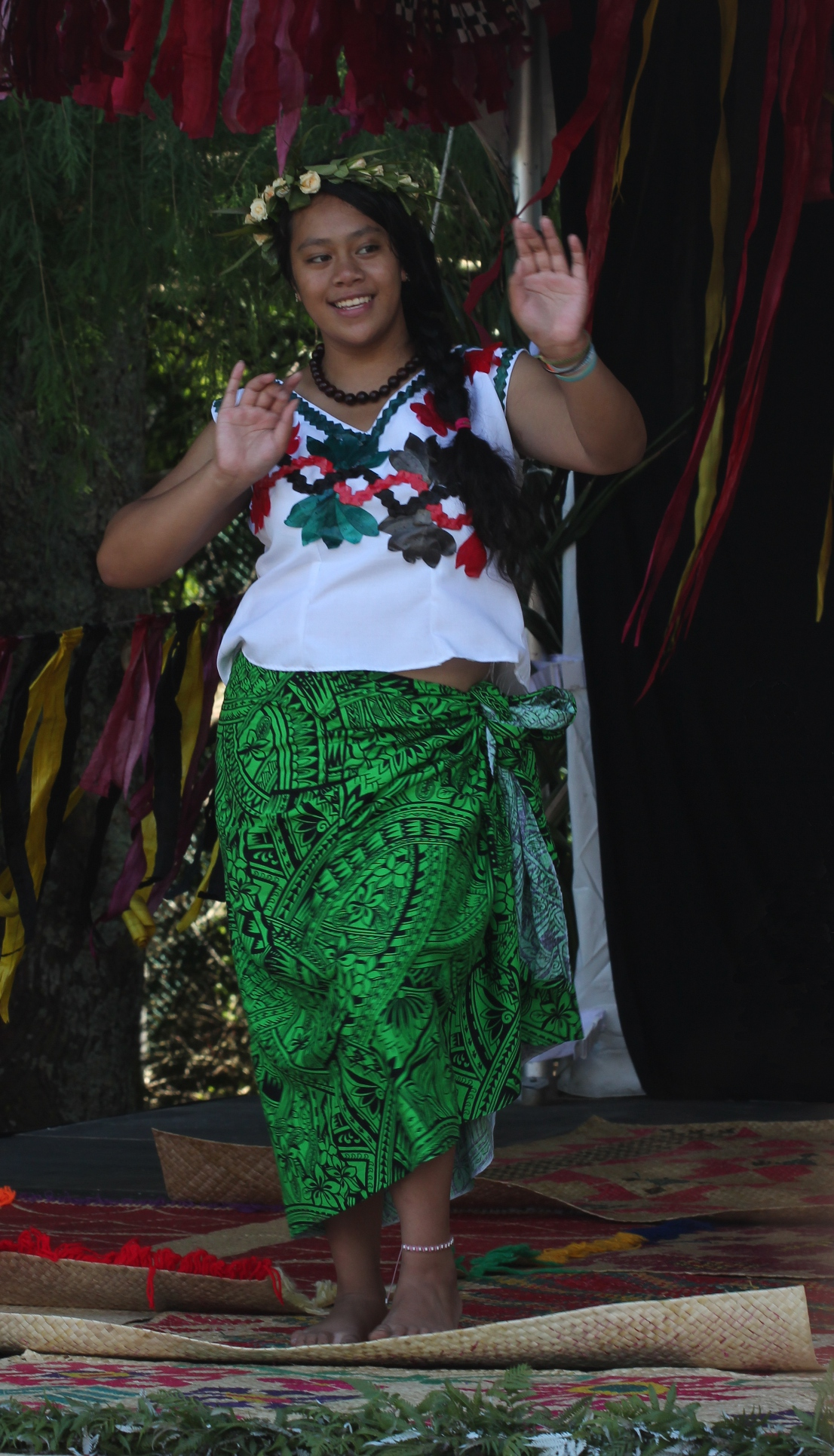
A Tuvaluan dancer at Auckland's Pasifika Festival

Dancing songs are the most common type of traditional Tuvaluan song. Older style dancing songs were performed while sitting, kneeling or standing. The two primary traditional dances of Tuvalu are the fakanau (for men) and oga (for women) and fakaseasea. Of these, the fakanau was a Niutao and Nukufetau dance performed primarily by the men, which was performed while sitting, or on Niutao while kneeling or standing, but without moving from the spot – the story of the song was illustrated by movements of the arms, hand and upper body. An elder could stand in the middle of a circle of performers keeping time. The fakanau, oga and the fakaseasea were used for celebrations and for praising fellow islanders. The only instrument was the use of a small wooden slit drum or a sound box, such as a tea chest; or the time was beaten with a fan or small rolled mat or the use of the palm of the hand on the floor.

The role of the fakanau as a praise song was an important part of Tuvaluan culture. A composer of a praise song would practice with the performers beforehand, and tell the subject of the song so he would have time to gather gifts. After the first performance, the subject would give the gifts to the performers, and would often continue to do so after future performances as well. The fakanau and oga tradition has since died out.

The fakaseasea was mainly performed by young unmarried women, who were on their feet, dancing and moving their arms, hand and upper body; while men and women would sing and beat the time. It is a slower song with very loose rules on how to dance to it, with variations on different islands with different names. The fakaseasea tradition continued although performed mainly by elders.

The traditional fatele was performed in the sitting or kneeling position by five or six young women, who while singing, moved their arms, hand and upper body; the men and woman act as the chorus. The most popular form of Tuvaluan dance music in the modern era is the fatele, which is influenced by European melody and harmony and is competitive, with each island divided into two sides. Lyricism is an important part of the fatele tradition, which begins with the older men singing a song in a meeting hall (maneapa), then gradually repeating it louder and quicker as the others join in; they also use empty cabin cracker cans or wooden boxes to beat the rhythm.

The modern fatele involves the young unmarried women on their feet, dancing in lines; with the men facing the dancers, sitting on the floor beating the time with their hands on the mats or on wooden boxes. The dancers enact the story being retold, and the music finally climaxes and ends abruptly. The festivities, including church festivals and weddings, at which the fatele are performed can go on for hours. The fatele tradition is shared with the music of Tokelau.

The swaying in rhythmic dances was considered erotic by missionaries and most traditional dancing was forbidden. The ban came along with restrictions on traditional religious activity as these dances served a spiritual purpose as well. As the influence of the missionaries diminished in the 20th century the siva dance tradition from Samoa became popular. This dance focuses on the individual dancers who have space in which to perform the steps and arm, hand and body movements of the Samoan siva dance tradition.

== See also ==
- Tuvalu mo te Atua
- Afaese Manoa § National anthem of Tuvalu
