= Fatele =

Tuvaluan traditional dance songs

Fatele performance by group from Nanumea during the independence day 2025

The fatele or faatele is a traditional dance song of Tuvalu. Dancing songs are the most common type of traditional Tuvaluan song, with other traditional dance styles including fakanau and fakaseasea. Fatele dancers should wear titi fakamanumanu coconut, pulaka leaf skirts, and lakei or manogi accessories such as fau head wreaths or other floral garlands.

The fatele, in its modern form, is performed at community events and to celebrate leaders and other prominent individuals, such as the visit of the Duke and Duchess of Cambridge in September 2012.

Te titi tao is a traditional skirt placed upon another skirt - a titi kaulama - and tops (teuga saka), headbands, armbands, and wristbands continue to be used in performances of the fatele.

The modern Tuvaluan style has absorbed many influences and can be described "as a musical microcosm of Polynesia, where contemporary and older styles co-exist".

== The traditional fatele ==
The traditional fatele was performed in the sitting or kneeling position by five or six young unmarried women, who while singing, moved their arms, hand and upper body; the men and women act as the chorus. The most popular form of Tuvaluan dance music in the modern era is the fatele, which is influenced by European melody and harmony and is competitive, with each island divided into two sides. Lyricism is an important part of the fatele tradition, which begins with the older men singing a song in a meeting hall (maneapa), then gradually repeating it louder and quicker as the others join in; they also use empty cabin cracker cans or wooden boxes, such as tea chests to beat the rhythm.

== The influences on the development of modern fatele ==
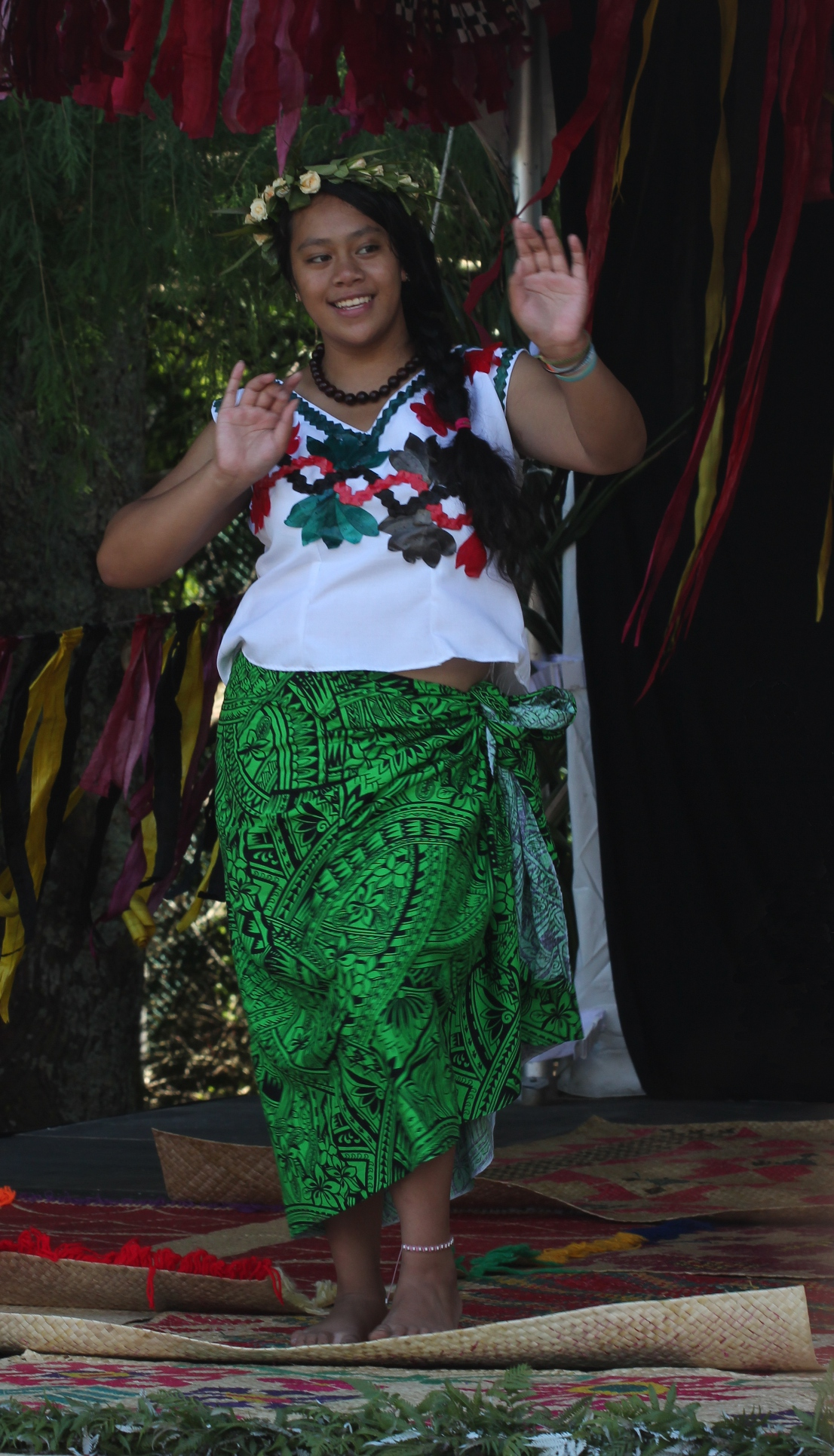
A Tuvaluan dancer at Auckland's Pasifika Festival

The influence of the Samoan missionaries sent to Tuvalu by the London Missionary Society from the 1860s resulted in the suppression of songs about traditional religions or magic. The swaying in rhythmic dances was considered erotic by missionaries and most traditional dancing was forbidden, along with restrictions on the traditional religious activity as these dances served a spiritual purpose as well. As the influence of the missionaries diminished in the 20th century the siva dance tradition from Samoa became popular and influenced the development of the modern fatele. The Samoan dance focuses on the individual dancers who have space in which to perform the steps and arm, hand and body movements of the Samoan siva dance tradition.

In 1960-1961 Gerd Koch, an anthropologist, made recordings of traditional songs on the atolls of Niutao, Nanumaga and Nukufetau. These songs were considered in a 1964 musicological publication, with a selection of the songs published in 2000 as Songs of Tuvalu together with two CDs of the recorded songs. The performances of fatele that were recorded by Gerd Koch would have been influenced by the missionaries, although Gerd Koch worked with the older members of the communities in order to identify and record music that predated the influence of the missionaries.

== The modern fatele ==
The modern fatele involves the women on their feet, dancing in lines; with the men facing the dancers, sitting on the floor beating the time with their hands on the mats or on wooden boxes. The dancers enact the story being retold, and the music finally climaxes and ends abruptly. The festivities, including church festivals and weddings, at which the fatele are performed can go on for hours. The fatele tradition is shared with the music of Tokelau.

== Publications ==
- Christensen, Dieter, Old Musical Styles in the Ellice Islands, Western Polynesia, Ethnomusicology, 8:1 (1964), 34–40.
- Christensen, Dieter and Gerd Koch, Die Musik der Ellice-Inseln, Berlin: Museum fur Volkerkunde, (1964)
- Koch, Gerd, Songs of Tuvalu (translated by Guy Slatter), Institute of Pacific Studies, University of the South Pacific (2000) ISBN 9820203147 ISBN 978-9820203143
- Linkels, Ad. The Real Music of Paradise (2000). In Broughton, Simon and Ellingham, Mark with McConnachie, James and Duane, Orla (Ed.), World Music, Vol. 2: Latin & North America, Caribbean, India, Asia and Pacific, pp 218–229. Rough Guides Ltd, Penguin Books. ISBN 1-85828-636-0
- Beaulieu, Marc. "Tuvaluan Faatele: A Performative and Historico-geographic Context" (PDF). Context 34 (2009): 49–64.
