= Tautoga =

Style of Rotuman dance

Rotuman tautoga performed in 1881 celebrating Rotuma's cession to Great Britain

The tautoga (pronounced [tauˈtoŋa]) is considered the most formal and restrained style of Rotuman dance, usually seen performed in large festivities or ceremonies (called kato'aga, a term summing up all traditional Rotuman ceremonies), or in public opportunities to showcase Rotuman culture. The tautoga style can be seen as comparable to the Tuvaluan fatele or Tongan lakalaka, and the "toga" [ˈtoŋa] sound to the word alludes to such an origin.

== Performers ==
Dance groups in tautoga (called hafa, a loanword referring to the halves of the dance group) can vary in number from 10 people to 100+ people, depending on availability of dancers and the scale of the event. The men and women usually arrange themselves in rows and in a rectangular shape, with men on one side, women on the other like the lakalaka, and also analogous to the Tongan dance, the most attractive and competent dancers stand in the front row centrally (this factor is referred to in Rotuman culture as "mạru") and these attributes decline over each row and column.

Male and female dance styles differ greatly, although their actions are synchronised and use similar shapes to evoke the words and feelings of the music to which they are dancing. Women's hand movements are generally slow and graceful, similar to the shapes made in Samoan or Tongan dance, and with their feet almost together, they make a subtle shuffling movement in time to the music, shifting weight from one foot to another. On the other hand, male movements are usually more vigorous and defined, with a more dramatic shifting of weight from one foot to another, enabled by having their legs usually further apart and somewhat crouching, such that the man half of a tautoga usually appears lower than the female half.

== Costume ==
Dress code is usually quite uniform, with all members of the tautoga wearing a "hạ' fạli", which is analogous to a sulu, sarong, or lava-lava, all of the same colour and design, as well as a collared shirts or blouses (a recent adaptation, probably a missionary addition, indicating respect for chief guests at functions). In addition to this, all members of the tautoga wear a sweet smelling flower in their ear, and a tefui (traditional garland) and titi (a skirt of long leaves), both of which are more elaborate and decorated for men than they are for women. In some instances dance groups are known to have worn the tailfeathers of the "täväke" bird (white-tailed tropicbird).

== Performance styles ==
Tautoga are usually performed in a suite of dances structured around three main types: "sua", "tiap hi'i", and "tiap forau". The dancing is accompanied by a group of singers who sit at the back, beating a pile of mats with large drumming sticks.

=== Sua ===
For the sua, dancers stand in place: men, with their feet apart; women with their feet together. The basic movement involves lifting the hands from the side, clasping them together in front of the waist, and releasing them to the sides; the dance also requires the alternate bending and straightening of the knees.

Sua normally consist of four-verse stanzas, whose texts allude to the occasion. The music consists of a single phrase in duple meter, repeated many times. All performers sing the same melody, but in parallel fifths: the women take the upper part; the men, the lower. Often, singers sound other notes, to create three- or four-note harmonies.

=== Tiap hi'i ===
After the sua come the tiap hi'i, dances of two kinds. In one, hi tägtäg 'languid hi' the women sing "hi'ie, hi'ie, hi'ie, hi'ie," while the men grunt to the effect of "hui'i, hui'i, hui'i, hui'i". The performers focus on a major triad, with the men singing the root, and women singing the third and fifth; a subdominant triad serves as an auxiliary. The performers clap their hands on downbeats. In the other kind of tiap hi, the hi sasap 'sustained hi', the men drag out the "hui" more. In both subgenres, some of the singers breathe while others vocalize, so the music spins a continuous thread of sound.

As in the sua, the women remain stationary while performing the tiap hi; they confine their movements to graceful, subtle hand motions. The men may jump from side to side, or in circles. In the tiap hi, the contrast between women's constraint and men's vitality becomes strongly marked. In one version of the genre, the men maintain a textless drone, while the women sing four or eight verses, recounting legends. In the sua and the tiap hi, each of the first three rows of dancers takes its turn in front; after completing a set of verses, the dancers in the first row drop back, to permit the row behind them to come forward (Hereniko 1991:128-130).

=== Tiap forau ===
Tiap forau offer a performative contrast: sua and tiap hi have a more restrained character; but lively yelping and clowning punctuate tiap forau. Spectators may spontaneously get up and join in the performance. During the dance, the back row splits: the men come down one side of the group, the women down the other, until they join in front, replacing the first row. The process continues until each row has had its turn in front. Songs usually acknowledge distinguished personages, especially the chiefs acting as hosts; the texts praise people whose labors have contributed to the event (Hereniko 1991:130-131). Many tiap forau are in duple meter, but some are in compound triple meter (transcribable as 6/8 time).

Tautoga may include from one to three sua, one or two tiap hi, and two or more tiap forau; for a complete performance, at least one example of each type must occur. A group of elders provides accompaniment for the sua and the tiap forau: with wooden sticks, they beat on a pile of folded mats. They begin each dance by introducing the song, and take responsibility for sustaining the rhythm and tempo.

In the late 19th century, a missionary described the songs of tautoga as sung in unison, except when both men and women participated. In the latter case, the men sang in a lower range, about a fifth lower, without following the melody closely. The rhythm changed little between the different songs. Most were characterized as "andante," but some songs, on humorous themes, were "allegro." The melody consisted of three or four different notes, the first note repeated three or four times, followed by a note a third higher, returning to the first, again repeated three times, followed by a higher or lower note, finishing with "an unharmonious flat note" (Müller, cited in Gardiner 1898:491).
