= Samoan dance =

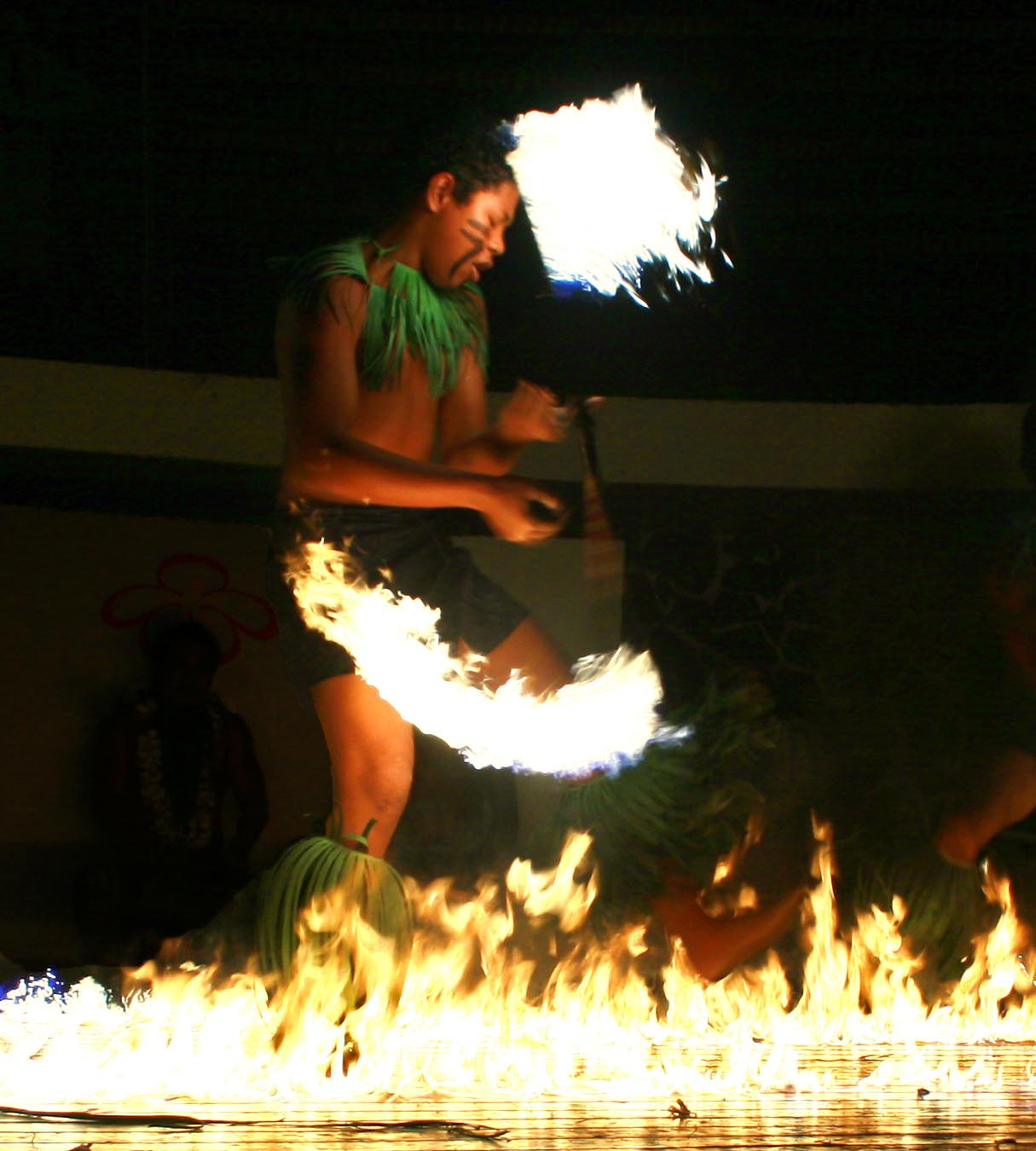
Boy performing a Samoa fire dance - siva afi

Samoan dance traditions reflect contact between Samoan culture and other cultures from the East and West. The space in which dance is conducted has been interpreted as a microcosm of Samoan society.

Samoan dance has been characterized as a means of maintaining Samoan identity in contact with other civilizations.

== Traditional dances ==
- Fa'ataupati
- Maulu'ulu
- Sasa
- Siva afi
- Siva tau
- Taualuga
- Matamatame
- 'Ailao
