= Tēfui =

Garlands of Rotuma

Tēfui are the unique garlands of the Pacific Island, Rotuma. They are made by tying multiple "fui" ("täntäne" leaves (polyscias) and sweet-smelling flowers in the shape of a star), with modern adaptations using wool or ribbon. The number of fui used is dependent on the situation. The Rotuman tēfui is used primarily as part of traditional ceremonies and celebrations (kato'aga), both happy and sad.

== Uses of the tēfui ==
Similar to the Hawaiian lei, presenting an individual is a sign of affection, given with the intent of indicating their emotional or social value. They hold particular importance within the context of traditional Rotuman ceremonies (collectively called kato'aga), adorning individuals, such as the recipients in the installation of chiefs or traditional welcoming ceremonies, or things such as graves or headstones after traditional death ceremonies. When adorning individuals, the tēfui will consist of 5 or 7 fuis, irrespective of whether the recipient is a man or woman. Alternately, in the instance of a grave setting, fui are arranged in rows around a grave site, with poles holding the rows of fui up. This is done on the "teran lima" ("fifth day" in Rotuman), referring to the fifth day after a death, when the major mourning period is meant to end.

Tēfui are also used as part of the costume in Rotuman dances, particularly the tautoga, with the numbers of fui varying between men and women. In the case of male dancers, their fui will number 5 or 7, whereas the female dancers wear a single fui, tied around their neck with a leaf of the Cordyline australis. A tefui has mainly 7 fuis which represent the 7 districts of Rotuma.
