= Gerd Koch =

German cultural anthropologist

Dr. Gerd Koch
- Born: 11 July 1922; Hanover, Germany
- Died: 19 April 2005 (aged 82); Off the coast of Newfoundland, Canada
- Education: Bachelor's degree, Göttingen University (1948); PhD, Göttingen University (1949)
- Occupation: Anthropologist
- Spouse: Marion Melk-Koch

Gerd Koch (11 July 1922 – 19 April 2005) was a German cultural anthropologist best known for his studies on the material culture of Kiribati, Tuvalu and the Santa Cruz Islands in the Pacific. He was associated with the Ethnological Museum of Berlin (German: Ethnologisches Museum; until 1999 Museum für Völkerkunde). His field work was directed to researching and recording the use of artefacts in their indigenous context, to begin to understand these societies.

His work in cultural and social anthropology extended to researching and recording the music and dance of the Pacific Islands. He collaborated with Dieter Christensen, a music-ethnologist, on The Music of the Ellice Islands (German: Die Musik der Ellice-Inseln) (1964) and Koch also published the Songs of Tuvalu (translated by Guy Slatter) (2000). In Tuvalu he was also known as 'Keti'.

== Biography ==
As a child Gerd Koch was fascinated by accounts of explorers including the Pacific voyages of James Cook. After he completed his secondary school leaving examination his family could not afford to send him to university so he became an apprentice salesman at the Pelikan fountain pen company in Hanover. He joined the German Navy in 1941 and was trained as a radio operator. His military service involved monitoring radio communications in the English Channel.

He was accepted at Göttingen University in the winter term of 1945 where he studied ethnology. He was interested in the subject of acculturation, the process of cultural change that results following meeting between cultures. In 1949 he wrote a dissertation that was titled Die frühen europäischen Einflüsse auf die Kultur der Bewohner der Tonga-Inseln 1616-1852 (The early European influences on the culture of the inhabitants of the Tonga Islands 1616-1852).

After he received his PhD, he worked at sorting and cataloguing exhibits of the Ethnological Museum of Berlin (Museum für Völkerkunde), which were in storage at Celle. In 1951 Koch carried out field studies in Tonga and also visited Samoa, Fiji and New Caledonia. On his return he found temporary work cataloguing the ethnological collection of the state museum in Hanover. In 1957 he was offered a position as the custodian of the Pacific (Südsee) Department at the Ethnological Museum of Berlin. He also lectured at the Free University of Berlin (Freie Universität Berlin).

In 1960 and 1961 he undertook field studies in the Ellice Islands (now known as Tuvalu). He returned to the Ellice Islands in 1964 then he carried out research in the Gilbert Islands (now known as Kiribati). At this time these islands were administered by the British as the Gilbert and Ellice Islands colony. In 1966 he undertook field studies in the Pacific, visiting the Gazelle Peninsula in New Britain, Papua New Guinea; followed by the Santa Cruz Islands and the Reef Islands in the Solomon Islands. In the 1970s he carried out field work in the Papua Province of New Guinea belonging to Indonesia, near the border with Papua New Guinea.

== Field studies ==
=== Tonga, Fiji and Samoa in 1951–1952 ===
In 1951 he obtained the support of the Notgemeinschaft der Deutschen Wissenschaft (Emergency Association of German Science) to carry out field work on cultural change in the Kingdom of Tonga from October 1951 to June 1952. He received assisted from the Crown Prince (later King Tāufaʻāhau Tupou IV) who arranged for Koch to stay with relatives on Nomuka in the Ha'apai group of islands.

Koch developed techniques in the recording of culture, including the use of tape-recorders and cinematographic cameras. Koch completed five short films about Tonga culture. During this expedition Koch also carried out research and made further documentary films in Fiji (in the Sigatoka region) and in Samoa (in Falealupo on the western tip of Savai'i). The films that Koch completed were made available for public exhibition in 1954 by the Encyclopaedia Cinematographica in Göttingen, with the films now held by the German National Library of Science and Technology (TIB) in Hanover.

=== Ellice islands in 1960–1961 ===
Koch visited the atolls of Nanumaga, Nukufetau and Niutao, which resulted in his publication of a book on the material culture of the Ellice Islands. Following the change of name to Tuvalu, the English translation by Guy Slatter was published under the title The Material Culture of Tuvalu.

In the early 1960s the elders of the islands retained memories of the late 19th century before the influence of the Christian missionaries (who were predominantly Samoan missionaries that were trained by the London Missionary Society) and the European traders and colonial administrators had impacted on the cultures of the islands. This allowed Koch to record the traditional music of Tuvalu and film traditional Tuvaluan dancing such as the fakanau, fakaseasea and fatele.

Koch filmed men of Niutao engaged in mock battles in which traditional styles of combat and self-defence called failima were displayed. These fighting techniques, using traditional spears and clubs, had been developed when the islands were subject to raids by warriors from Tonga and the Gilbert Islands (Kiribati).

Gerd Koch also made recordings of traditional songs on the islands of Niutao, Nanumaga and Nukufetau. These songs were considered in a 1964 musicological publication, with a selection of the songs published in 2000 as Songs of Tuvalu together with two CDs of the recorded songs.

=== Gilbert and Ellice islands in 1963 ===
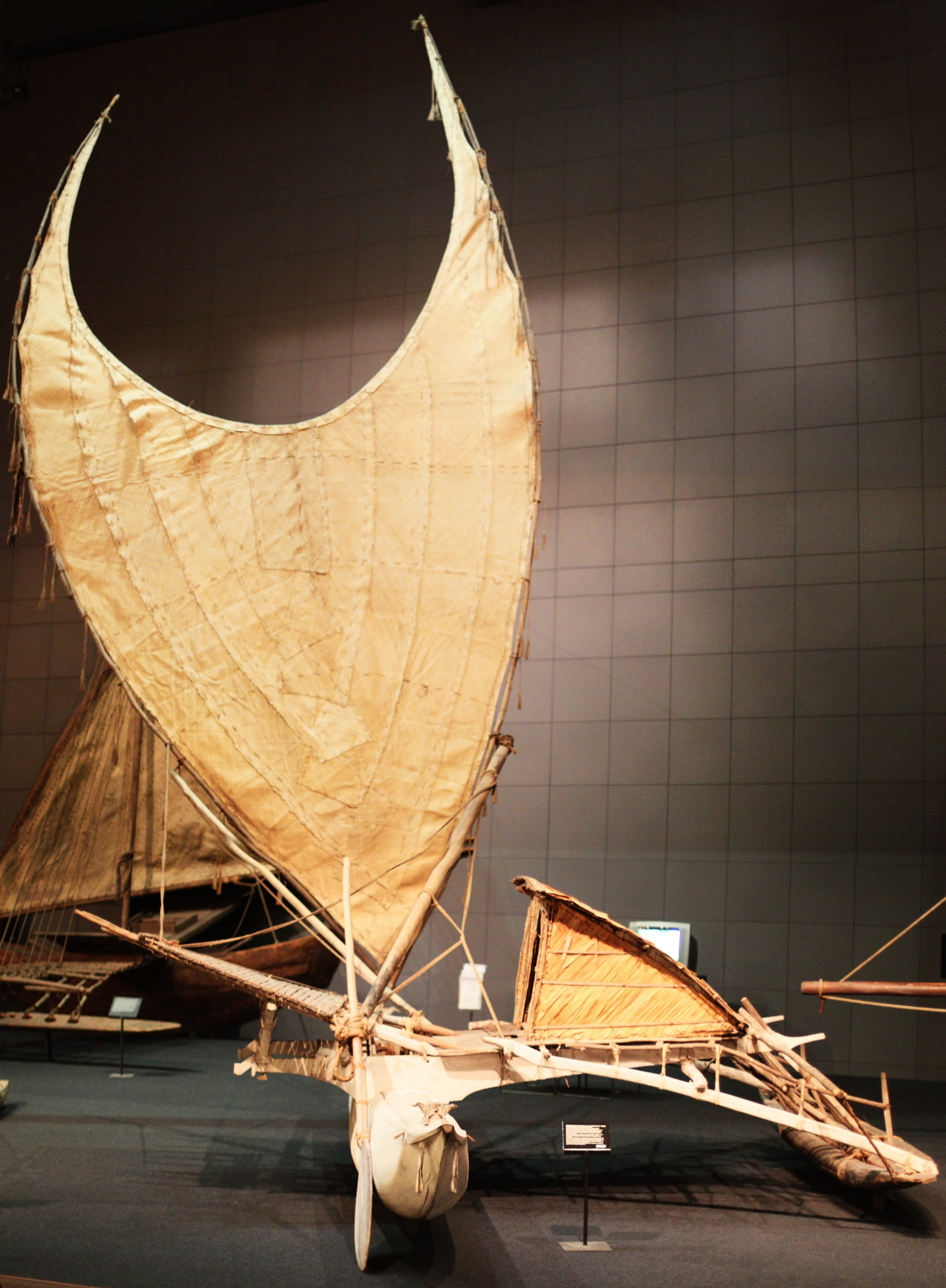
Tepukei (ocean-going outrigger canoe) from the Santa Cruz Islands

He returned to the Ellice Islands, where he showed the films he made on his previous visit and made further film documentaries. Koch then carried out research continued on the Gilbert Islands, and in 1965 he published a book on the material culture of the Gilbert Islands. Following the change of name to Kiribati, the English translation by Guy Slatter was published under the title The Material Culture of Kiribati.

=== New Britain, Papua New Guinea and the Santa Cruz Islands in 1966–67 ===
From November 1966 to the end of February 1967 he undertook field studies in the Pacific, spending several weeks on Gazelle Peninsula in New Britain and in the Maprik District of East Sepik Province in Papua New Guinea (PNG). He then spent four months in the Solomon Islands, carrying out research at Graciosa Bay on Nendö Island (Ndende/Ndeni) in the Santa Cruz Islands and on Pileni and Fenualoa in the Reef Islands and returned with documentary film, photographic and audio material. In 1971 Koch published Die Materielle Kultur der Santa Cruz-Inseln.

Koch did not collect artefacts that were of importance to the inhabitants. Significant artefacts that he brought back to the Ethnological Museum of Berlin were the gable roof of a large meeting house from the East Sepik Province and the last still complete Tepukei (ocean-going outrigger canoe) from the Santa Cruz Islands.

=== Irian Jaya (Papua Province of Indonesia) 1970s ===
In the 1970s Gerd Koch and Klaus Helfrich, who subsequently became the Director of the Berlin Museum, attempted to get funding from the German Research Foundation (Deutsche Forschungsgemeinschaft (DFG)) for an inter-discipline project to carry out field work in the Papua Province of New Guinea belonging to Indonesia, near the border with Papua New Guinea, which Europeans has not visited, and which in the 1970s had become a focus for Christian evangelists. While the intended inter-discipline project did not proceed the project resulted in a major exhibition at the Ethnological Museum of Berlin entitled "Steinzeit Heute" (Stone Age Today), which opened in 1979.

== Career ==
For more than two decades he was the Deputy Director of the Ethnological Museum of Berlin. He was also the co-publisher of the Baessler-Archiv Beitrage zur Volkerkunde Neue Folge, which published articles on social anthropology. In 1984 he was awarded an honorary professorship from the Free University of Berlin. His final exhibition was 'Boote aus aller Welt' (Boats from all over the World). He retired from the Museum in 1985, although he continued to lecture at the university until 1990.

== Death and legacy ==
Koch returned to Tuvalu and Tonga in 1996, where he met islanders who were children when he visited in the 1960s. Following his retirement he continued to write and publish on ethnological topics. Gerd Koch brought his life to a self-determined end on 19 April 2005 off the coast of Newfoundland when travelling by boat to New York.

His field work produced 121 documentary films, with the films now held by the TIB in Hanover. His film work includes 15 short documentary films about aspects of Tuvaluan culture and a further 70 films were made by Koch in the Gilbert Islands (Kiribati). The Ethnological Museum of Berlin also holds approximately 12,000 photos and an extensive collection of audio tapes (including music-ethnological material) recorded by Koch.

He planned the permanent Pacific Exhibition at the Ethnological Museum of Berlin that opened in 1970 and which continued in the form he designed for over 30 years. The Pacific Exhibition occupied 3,000 sq. meters, with the 17 m. high ceilings allowing the exhibition of boats and architectural elements in their original size, including the only surviving original Tepukei (ocean-going canoe) that Dr. Koch obtained in the Santa Cruz Islands in 1966–67.

== Publications ==
His published work includes:

- (in German and English) Suedsee-Gestern und Heute: Der Kulturwandel bei den Tonganern und der Versuch einer Deutung dieser Entwicklung (Pacific – yesterday and to-day: acculturation with the Tongans and an attempt at an interpretation of this development) was published in 1955 as Volume 7 of Research into the history of culture, edited by Dr Nabil Georg Eckart, Professor of Kant University, Brunswick, and Dr Herman Trimborn, Professor of Bonn University. English translation by P.E. Klarwill, Wellington, NZ published by Albert Limback Verlag, Brunswick with the assistance of the German Research Association (1958).
- (in German and English) Die Materielle Kulture der Ellice-Inseln, Berlin: Museum für Völkerkunde (1961); The English translation by Guy Slatter, was published as The Material Culture of Tuvalu, University of the South Pacific in Suva (1981) ASIN B0000EE805.
- (in German and English) Die Materielle Kultur der Gilbert-Inseln, Berlin: Museum für Völkerkunde (1965) The English translation by Guy Slatter, was published as The Material Culture of Kiribati, University of the South Pacific in Suva (1986) ISBN 9789820200081.
- (in German) Kultur der Abelam: die Berliner "Maprik"-Sammlung (1968) (Culture of the Abelam: The "Maprik" Berlin Collection) of Maprik District, East Sepik Province, PNG.
- (in German) Die Materielle Kultur der Santa Cruz-Inseln, Berlin: Museum für Völkerkunde (1971 & 1972).
- (in German) Iniet: Geister in Stein: die Berliner Iniet-Figuren-Sammlung, Berlin: Museum für Völkerkunde (1982) ("Iniet: Spirits in stone": Iniet figures in the Berlin Collection) from New Britain, PNG.
- (in German) Malingdam, Ethnographische Notizen über ein Siedlungsbereich im oberen Eipomek-Tal, zentrales Bergland von Irian Jaya (West-Neuguinea), Indonesien (Malingdam, Ethnographic Notes on a Settlement in the Higher Eipomek Valley, central Highlands of Irian Jaya [West New Guinea]) was published in 1984 as Volume 15 of the series "Mensch, Kultur und Umwelt im Zentralen Bergland von West-Neuguinea" (Humans, Culture and Environment in the Central Highlands of West-New Guinea).
- (in English) Songs of Tuvalu (translated by Guy Slatter), Institute of Pacific Studies, University of the South Pacific (2000) ISBN 9820203147 ISBN 9789820203143.
