= Tepukei =

Type of Polynesian boat

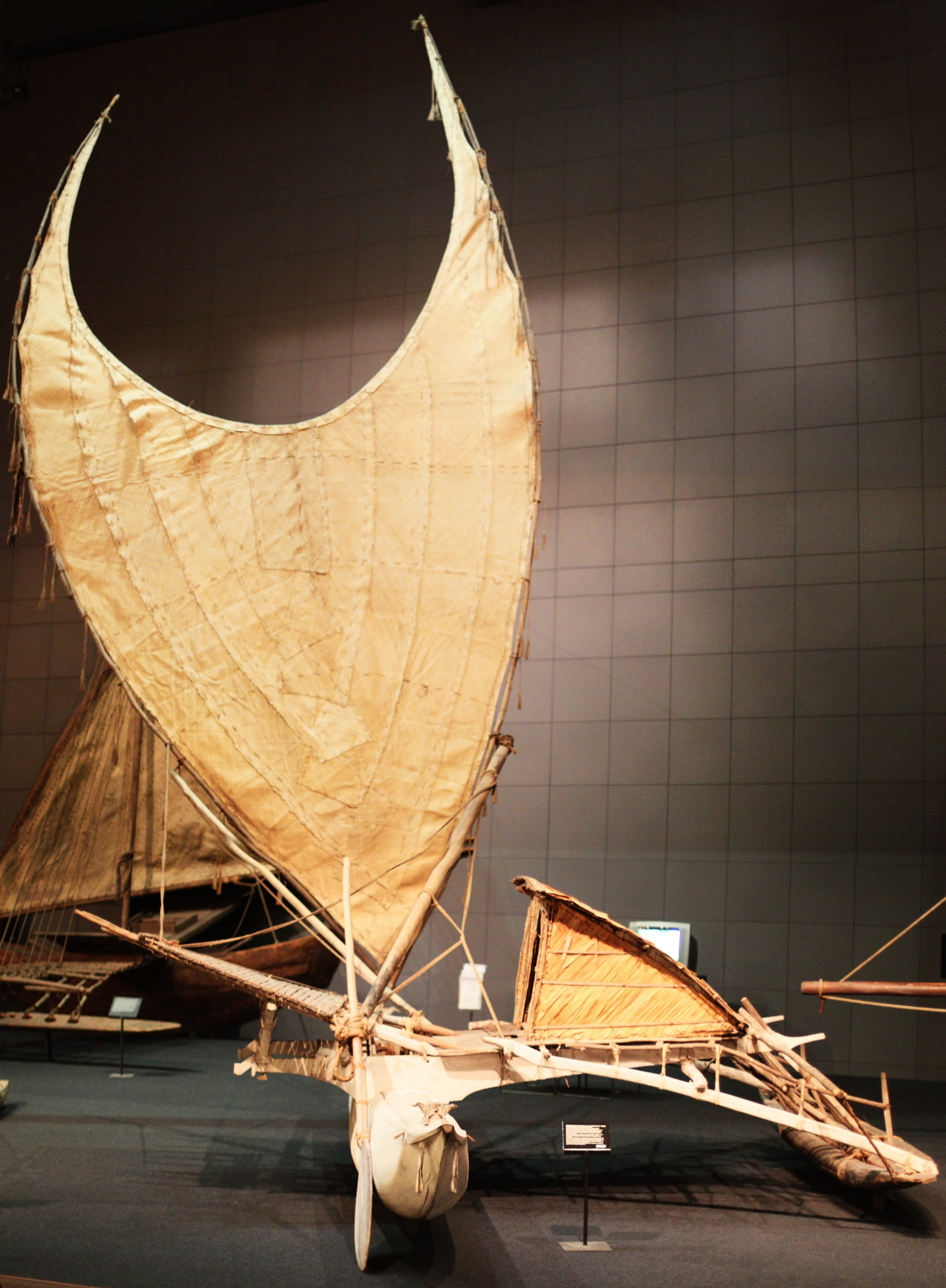
The Maunga Nefe, named after a mountain on the island Vanikoro, the home of the dead. This vaka was built on Taumako and sailed out of Nifiloli; it was used for travel and trading within the Santa Cruz archipelago.

A tepukei, tepuke or TePuke is a Polynesian boat type, characterized by its elaborate decking, its submerged hulls and symmetrical "crab claw" sail slender foil or radically extended tips claw sail (Te Laa). Tepukei boats are produced primarily by the Polynesian-speaking inhabitants of Taumako (Duff Islands), and have been occasionally borrowed by other Polynesian and Melanesian societies.

== Name ==
The word comes from the phrase te puke [tepuke] in Vaeakau-Taumako and other Polynesian languages. Removing the noun article te, the original meaning of puke [puke], as reconstructed for the ancestor Proto-Polynesian is “bow and stern decking on a canoe”. By metonymy, the name of that deck has become used for the ship as a whole. (The Proto-Polynesian root for “boat” or “canoe” is *waka.)

== History ==
The tepukei was first reported in print by Spanish explorer Álvaro de Mendaña in 1595, on his visit to the Santa Cruz Islands.

In the Solomons the canoes are plank-built, but here they are "dugouts" with an outrigger attached, as is the case in Southern Melanesia. [...] The body of the canoe is a log hollowed out with a shell adze: to this an outrigger is attached to steady it, and on this the goods are placed. The outrigger is always on the lee side. [...] The Tepukei is made upon the same principle as the small canoe, but the hollow log is caulked and acts as a float to support the big stage or deck — on the stage is a hut in which the voyagers can take refuge from the heat of the sun. The wind is caught by means of a lofty and strikingly shaped sail, which is plaited by the women (the Papuans use two similar sails for their big canoes), and the steersman uses a long paddle. Voyages are made as far as Vanikolo, and Tepukeis have been even known to make their way to the Solomon Islands. At night they steer by the stars. [...] When beached, the Tepukei is carefully covered with coconut mats (a small canoe is turned upside down). To pull a Tepukei up a steep beach is a laborious task and requires many hands; like our own deep-sea sailors, they sing as they pull. [...] The following account of the building of a canoe was given by a Cruzian — "Only some men may dig out canoes — those whose ancestors dug them out. When a father is near death, that father takes water and washes his son's hands, and they think that the father is giving to his son understanding and wisdom to make canoes, and he signifies it through water. When a man has finished a canoe he takes it down to the sea and paddles very far, and makes it roll on the surf, and thus he thinks that he drives away the ghost from the adze with which he dug out the canoe, and the ghost of the spot where he cut down the wood for the canoe."

— W. C. O'Ferrall, Santa Cruz and the Reef Islands (1908)

A tepukei looks like an outrigger canoe with a crab claw sail, and is a very sophisticated ocean-going sailing ship, belonging to the proa type (a main hulls and a massive, buoyant outrigger). Contrary to what Mendana wrote, the outrigger is always kept to windward. Its main differences from other proas are:

- The main hull (vaka) has an almost circular section whose submerged profile remains constant despite heeling, and has less almost no dry surface when trimmed for sailing. The design is meant to carry heavy loads.
- The vaka's top is very close to the flotation line, so it is closed with planks (tetau) and the accommodations for the crew are on an elevated platform over the Lakauhalava (the crossbeams connecting the main hull and the smaller, windward outrigger)
- The radical claw sail.

In common with a typical proa, it uses a radically long-armed form of crab claw sail. However, its particular variant, when a small, stiff model was evaluated in modern wind tunnel tests, shows superior performance over two of three points of sail.

W. C. O'Ferrall, an Anglican missionary to Melanesia between 1897 and 1904, described the tepukei as a "sailing canoe". He described it as consisting of a dugout log equipped with a deck upon which a small hut was built, powered by a "lofty and strikingly shaped sail", and steered with a long paddle. He reported that men from Santa Cruz used the boat to travel as far away as the Solomon Islands.

The Maunga Nefe, which may be the only te alolili that was built prior to 1970, is in the Ethnological Museum of Berlin. People of Outer Reef Islands (Vaeakau people) call them "Puki" making no distinction between tealolili and tepukei designs. It was brought by Dr. Gerd Koch from the Santa Cruz Islands in 1967.

In recent years, tepukei have been experiencing a renaissance. The Vaka Taumako Project has helped support the construction of these boats, and some vessels inspired by ancient designs are even being built in San Francisco.

Sail plan of what Taumako builders call a tealolili (a smaller, simpler design than tepukei), The simplistic image below was drawn from photos of the Maunga Nefe and the Vaka Taumako Project. It shows a symmetrical double-ended hull, and long-armed claw sail, with windward and leeward booms.

Stern view of the Maunga Nefe. Use red/blue 3-D glasses to see this image stereoscopically.

Stern view similar to the full-colour image above.

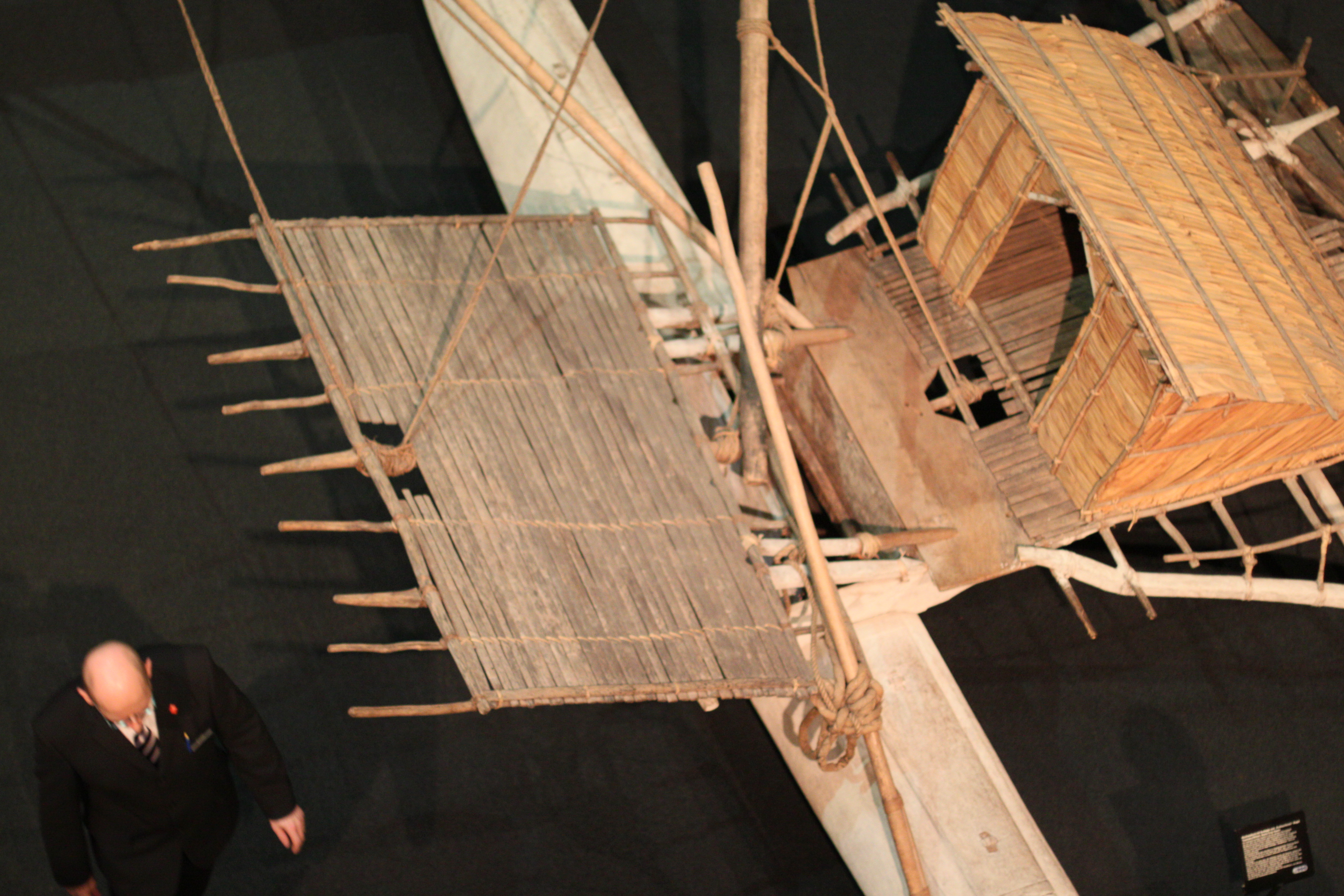
Deck area of the Maunga Nefe.

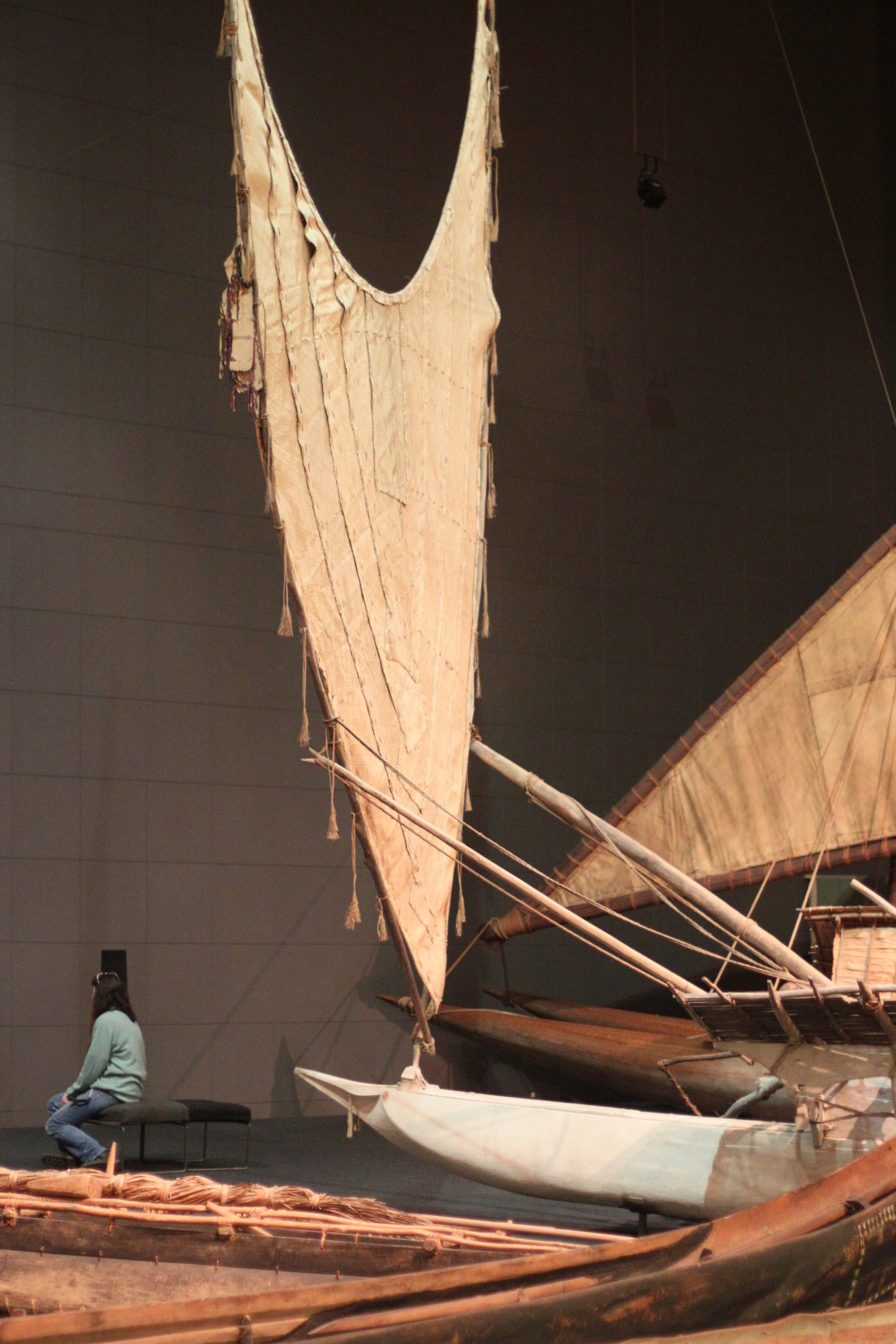
Side view of sail, with turbulence-reducing "ornaments".

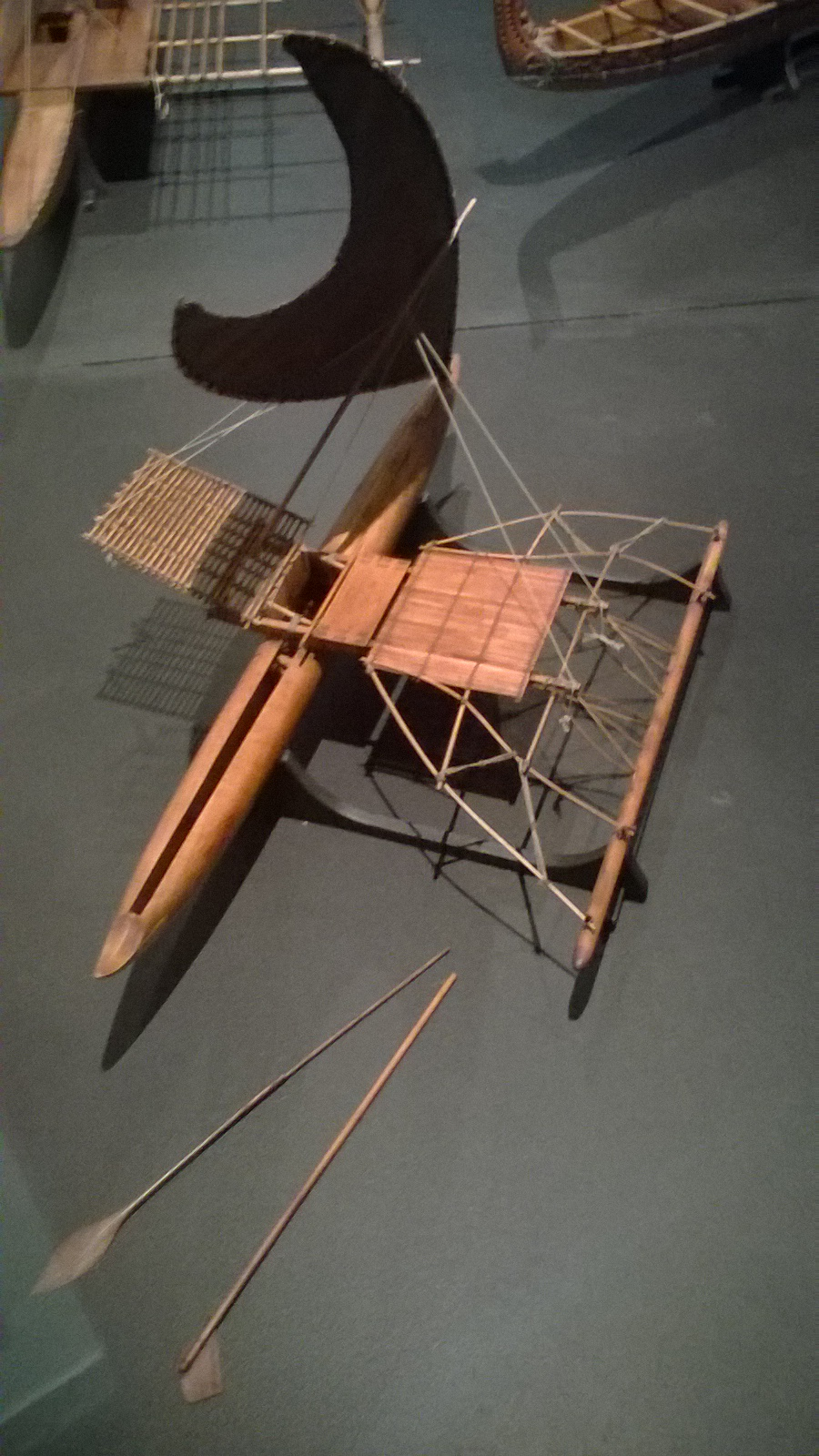
Top view of a model
