= Mak Saʻmoa =

Mak Sa'moa is an informal Rotuman dance form derived from Samoan movement styles (Mak Sa'moa meaning "Samoan dance" in Rotuman), including the style of hand movements between man and woman, and the shuffling/twisting of the feet in and out, as in the Siva Samoa.

Although considered a traditional Rotuman dance style, and having been used informally for some time, it wasn't until recent contact with Samoans (such as missionaries for the London Missionary Society or the Methodist Church of Fiji and Rotuma) that Rotumans realised the art form was in fact borrowed from early Samoan ancestors, such as Raho, to whom Rotumans attribute as the "founders" of the islands.

Mak Sa'moa is generally more popular nowadays amongst older generations of Rotuman people, who appreciate its varying but generally slower pace, and the style of music and lyric as being more Rotuman than the popular Mak Rarotoga whose borrowed tunes emulate the fastpaced Tahitian and Rarotongan dances of otea and tamure, and are commonly danced at the Rotuman festivity of the av' mane'a season, the Rotuman fara.

== Sources ==
- Rotuman Music and Dance
