= Music of Tokelau =

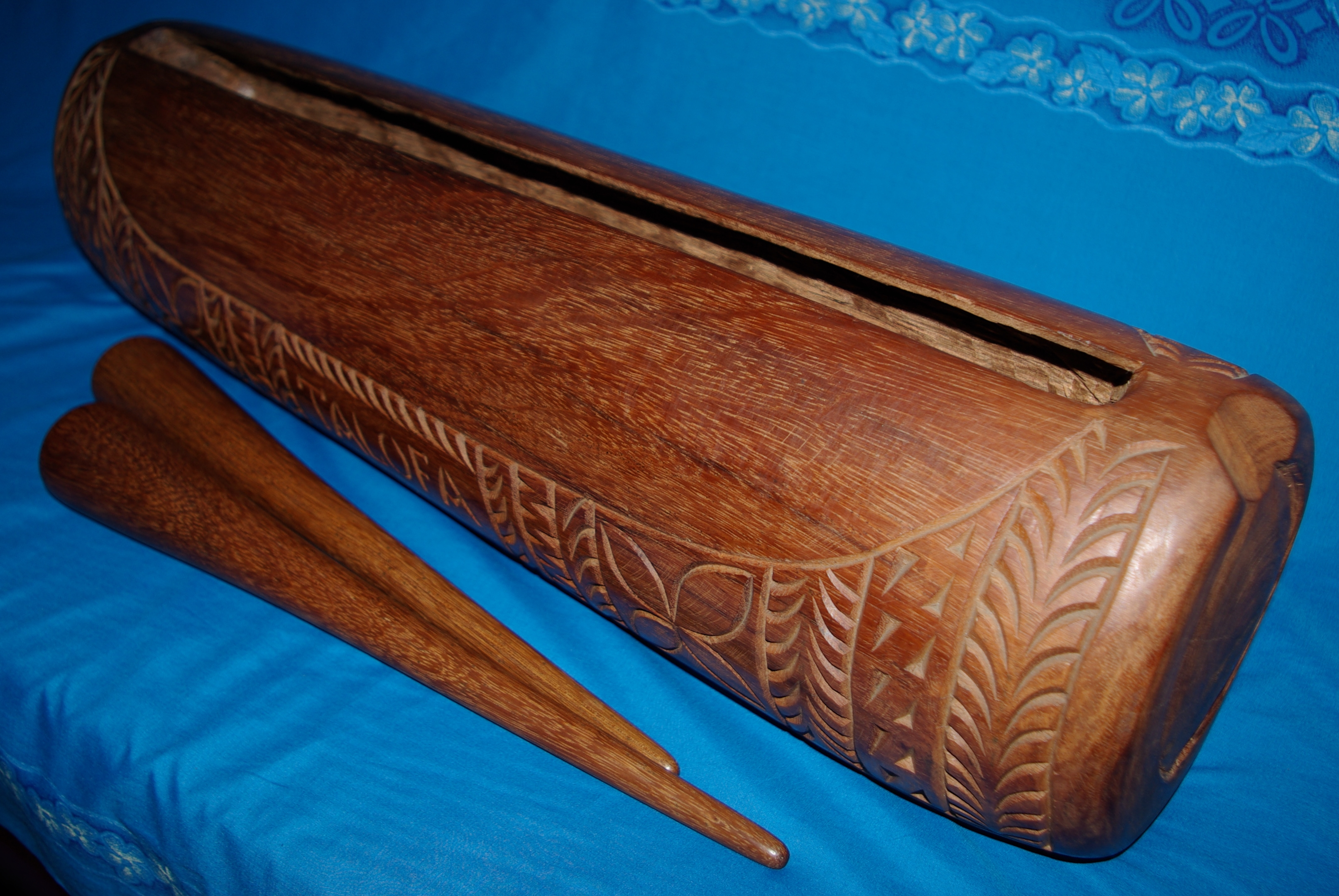
The pate slit drum is used to make music in Tokelau.

The music of Tokelau occurs in the atolls of Atafu, Nukunonu, and Fakaofo. It is dominated by communal choral activity in harmony, with percussive accompaniment including log drums (pate), pokihi (wooden box) and apa (biscuit tin). Nukunonu is notable for traditional song and dance.

== History ==
Nukunonu is one of the three islands of Tokelau (the other two are Atafu and Fakaofo) where, under the positive influence of the Catholic Christian missionaries, traditional music and song took positive development. Though the music and dance form was imported from Tuvalu, it was adopted into the “acculturated fatele” which has replaced the old forms. Drums were a common accompaniment in music for quite a long time. Slit gongs was also another instrument in use since 1841 that was noticed by the United States Exploring Expedition in 1843. Pokihi (mat covered boxes) is another widely seen instrument used in fatele music, which was a post European innovation seen even in 1921. Alan Thomas was the first person to study the music of Tokelau in 1980s and submit a Master of Arts thesis on fatele in 1986.

The venue, which is popular for holding music and dance performances, is known as fiafia or festival held at the meeting house where villagers congregate and the music groups arrange themselves according to their village affiliation known as faitu (sides or halves). The performances are held in an atmosphere of fun and humor and are conducted till the elders in the group order it be stopped.

== Song and dance ==
Pehe are songs of Tokelau, while pehe anamua are ancient songs; hiva are dances. Together, they are popular forms of music in Tokelau. The best-known form of traditional music is fatele, a dance performed at many community gatherings and events. Each song begins with a stanza that is repeated up to a half-dozen times, followed by increased pitch and tempo near the end of the piece. This tradition is shared with the music of Tuvalu. Fetele is a song form which is an abridged and fascinating song rendering of compositions which are situation specific and sung to the text format. The community is usually aware of the singer's capability in composing and rendering such songs. The experienced composer and singer of these songs is known as "pulotu". One such pulotu who is popular among the public is Ihaia, who is not only a singer but also carpenter and fisherman, with oratory skills blended with humour.

== Songs ==
Fakanau are fishing songs. Hoa are sung with lead and answering voices; tuala, wedding processions songs, are a form of hoa. Mako (love songs) are sung by an individual and include sexual or emotional phrasing. Pehe lagilagi is sung in four-part harmony while seated. Tagi are songs within tales. Funeral songs include the vale (memorial) and haumate (laments).

== Instruments ==
Drums called pasu or pabu were present in 1841 at the time of the United States Exploring Expedition, but are no longer used or even remembered. Considered unusual for Western Polynesia, the instrument was cylindrical in frame, upright in its playing position, crafted of shark's skin, and beaten with two sticks. Slit-gongs, known as lala or lali, were also described in 1841. They were created from a hollow log and struck with a heavy beater. A smaller version of slit gongs was known as kaulalo. Another smaller slit drum, the pate, was used with handclapping or pati (slapping) during taualuga dancing. Weaving boards (papa or papafailalaga) are struck with thin sticks and produce a brittle sound. Beaten with sticks, moega (rolled mats) are used as accompaniment during mauluulu dancing. Plywood is used for crafting the pokihi, a mat-covered box; it accompanies the fatele dance. Other instruments used in Tokelau are the utete (Jew's harp), fagufagu (flute), pu (shell trumpet), ligoligo (leaf whizzer), pu (leaf oboe), and fagufagu (slit tubes).

== Bands ==
New Zealand-based band Te Vaka is composed of Tokelauans living in New Zealand, and also has members from Tuvalu and Samoa. They have achieved international commercial success. Many of their songs incorporate elements of Tokelauan music. Their music and dance style are not the traditional Pacific Ocean genre and does not just involve guitars and hula skirts, typical of the ocean region. They have recorded many albums and traveled to Australia, England and Europe. The music group has blended traditional music and contemporary styles and put the music of Tokelau as the leading group from the country. They recorded their first album in 1997 which was called the Te Vaka. The second album released in 1999 was titled Ki Mua. The music group is headed by Opetaia who is versatile, performs on guitar, percussion, sings and is also the music composer. His music was inspired by the oral tradition of the folk stories narrated by his people.
