= Maulu'ulu =

Type of dance

The Maulu'ulu (Note: Pratt (1893) referred to it as, "a kind of night-dance recently introduced".) is an indigenous dance performed by the Samoan people. Contemporary ma'ulu'ulu compositions and choreographies are generally performed by female dancers, although some villages have a tradition of men and women dancing together. The maulu'ulu was one of several dance forms (such as Taualuga) and choral song styles (including 'otuhaka) that were brought into the Kingdom of Tonga through cultural diffusion in the late nineteenth century. Considerable divergence of technique and choreography now differentiate the Samoan maulu'ulu from the Tongan Ma'ulu'ulu, although their common origin continues to be celebrated.

== Performance ==
The maulu'ulu was originally an artistic expression of everyday activities, domestic duties, and customary observations. Such themes are readily observed in the motifs embedded within lyrics and choreographies which allude to tasks such as weaving, paddling, making tapa cloth, cultivating crops, and fishing. While these themes are common in other Samoan dance and song genres, the ma'ulu'ulu is distinguished by the staggered rows of performers executing the same movements. Performers in the front rows usually sit cross-legged, while middle rows kneel, and back rows stand. Another distinguishing feature of the Samoan ma'ulu'ulu is the coordinated transitioning between seated, kneeling, and standing positions.

The word maulu'ulu' literally means "to sprinkle" or "light rain" - alluding to the lighthearted and jovial style of performance which was intended to refresh and reinvigorate audiences and social events as a "light rain" would cool the stifling tropical heat of a summer day.

Formations and transitions are the hallmark of the maulu'ulu - the graceful footwork employed in walking from one row to another or from one area of performance to another. Mirrored motifs are commonly choreographed in such a way that the movements of one row of dancers is mirrored by corresponding movements executed by the dancers in the adjacent row. Proficient dancers are judged by the expressions of the face (smiling) and head, along with the grace and animation of hand and finger movements and smooth transitioning footwork.

The seated and kneeling formations of the Samoan maulu'ulu are the most visible component of the Tongan Ma'ulu'ulu analog genre of Tonga. The Tongan ma'ulu'ulu in its current stylistic performance is more akin to the Samoan Sasa.

The Manu Samoa rugby team used to perform a lively version of the ma'ulu'ulu as a pre-game warm-up ritual until 1991 when the siva tau was choreographed (based on the Maori haka made famous by the New Zealand All Blacks rugby squad.
