= Siva Samoa =

Samoan dance

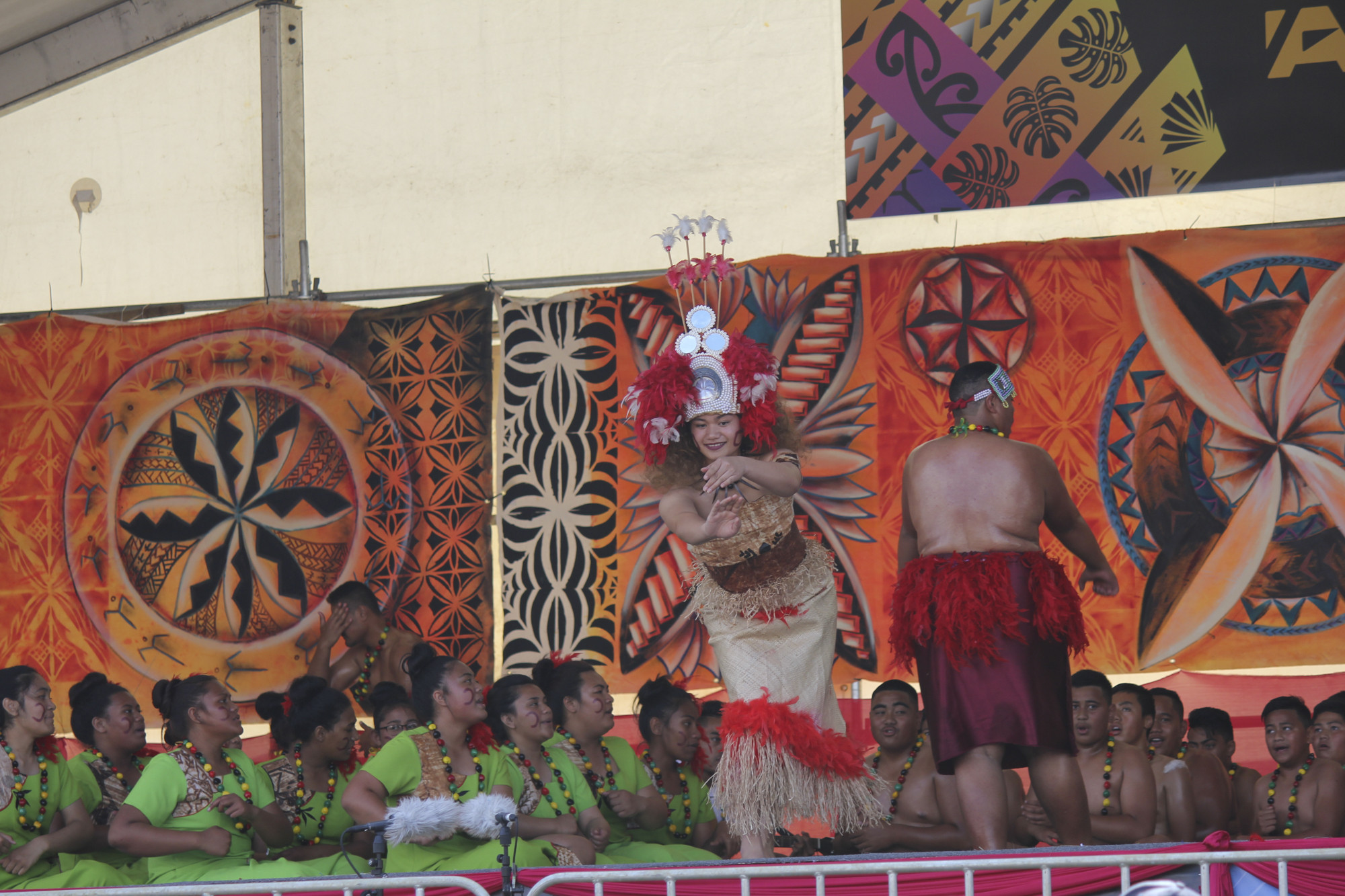
Siva Samoa performance at Polyfest 2015

Siva Samoa is the Samoan term for a Samoan dance. It is practiced in Samoa, and around the world by the Samoan diaspora. There are siva schools in New Zealand, Australia, and the United States.

Traditional Samoan dancing is one area of the culture that has been the least affected by western civilisation. It requires the dancer to retain grace; movement of the arms and hands are done so in a subtle but delicate manner. In earlier times, high chiefs or matais performed this special dance but modern day it is performed by a taupou. A version of Siva Samoa, called Mak Sa'moa, is a popular traditional dance style in Western Samoa.

Other forms of traditional Samoan dancing include the taualuga, siva afi, and sasa. There is also the māuluulu, Laumei, and Tautasi.

The most popular is the Siva Afi in which the dancer dances with fire on Samoan Knives, one, two, and even up to four knives can be used.
