= Culture of Kiribati =

Contemporary Kiribati culture is centered on the family, the church and the sea.

== Music ==
Kiribati folk music is generally based around chanting or other forms of vocalizing, accompanied by body percussion. Public performances in modern Kiribati are generally performed by a seated chorus, accompanied by a guitar. However, during formal performances of the standing dance (Te Kaimatoa) or the hip dance (Te Buki) a wooden box is used as a percussion instrument. This box is constructed so as to give a hollow and reverberating tone when struck simultaneously by a chorus of men sitting around it. Traditional songs are often love-themed, but there are also competitive, religious, children's, patriotic, war and wedding songs. There are also stick dances (which accompany legends and semi-historical stories. These stick dances or 'tirere' (pronounced seerere) are only performed during major festival.

== Dance ==
The uniqueness of Kiribati when compared with other forms of Pacific Island dance is its emphasis on the outstretched arms of the dancer and the sudden birdlike movement of the head. The Frigate bird (Fregata minor) on the Kiribati flag refers to this bird-like style of Kiribati dancing. Most dances are in the standing or sitting position with movement limited and staggered. Smiling whilst dancing as seen in the modern Hawaiian Hula is generally considered vulgar within the context of Kiribati dancing. This is due to its origin of not being solely as a form of entertainment but as a form of storytelling and a display of the skill, beauty and endurance of the dancer.

== Literature ==
There have been few published I-Kiribati literary writers. Teresia Teaiwa stands out as one of the most notable.

== Bwaka ni buto celebrations ==
There is a celebration after a baby is born in Kiribati culture called ‘bwaka ni buto’. It is when the umbilical cord is cut. There are special items created by women such as a 'te inaai', a woven mat, garlands for the parents 'te itera' and a bracelet for the baby. The ceremony involves dancing and feasting.

== Bubuti system ==
The bubuti system occurs when one is in need of some item and may borrow it from a friend, relative or neighbour. Culturally speaking, it is shameful to refuse such a request but situation and context does have a bearing on the outcome.

== Material culture ==
In 1963 Gerd Koch, a German anthropologist, carried out research in the islands of Kiribati to record traditional practices, and in 1965 he published the Material Culture of the Gilbert Islands. His field work produced 70 films of traditional practices and material culture. The Ethnological Museum of Berlin also holds photos and an extensive collection of audio tapes (including music-ethnological material) made by Koch.

== Social problems ==
Drinking alcohol is part of the culture and consumption of toddy, a locally made fermented coconut juice, is widespread. Alcoholism is a common problem, especially on the main island of Tarawa. Domestic violence is also common.

== Dueling ==
Kiribati has a history of contrived and ritualized duels. The armor was made of thickly woven sennit, a kind of coconut fiber. The duelists wore helmets made of blowfish remains. The helmets were resilient and, due to the structure of blowfish, covered with many points. The weapons resembled broadswords with a serrated edge created with many shark teeth. The duels were performed mostly for the purpose of settling disputes and maintaining honor. The practicality of the duels is debatable. Due to the difficulty of moving in this armor, falling over and becoming unable to get back up was common enough that duel assistants were required.

== Kiribati traditional martial arts ==
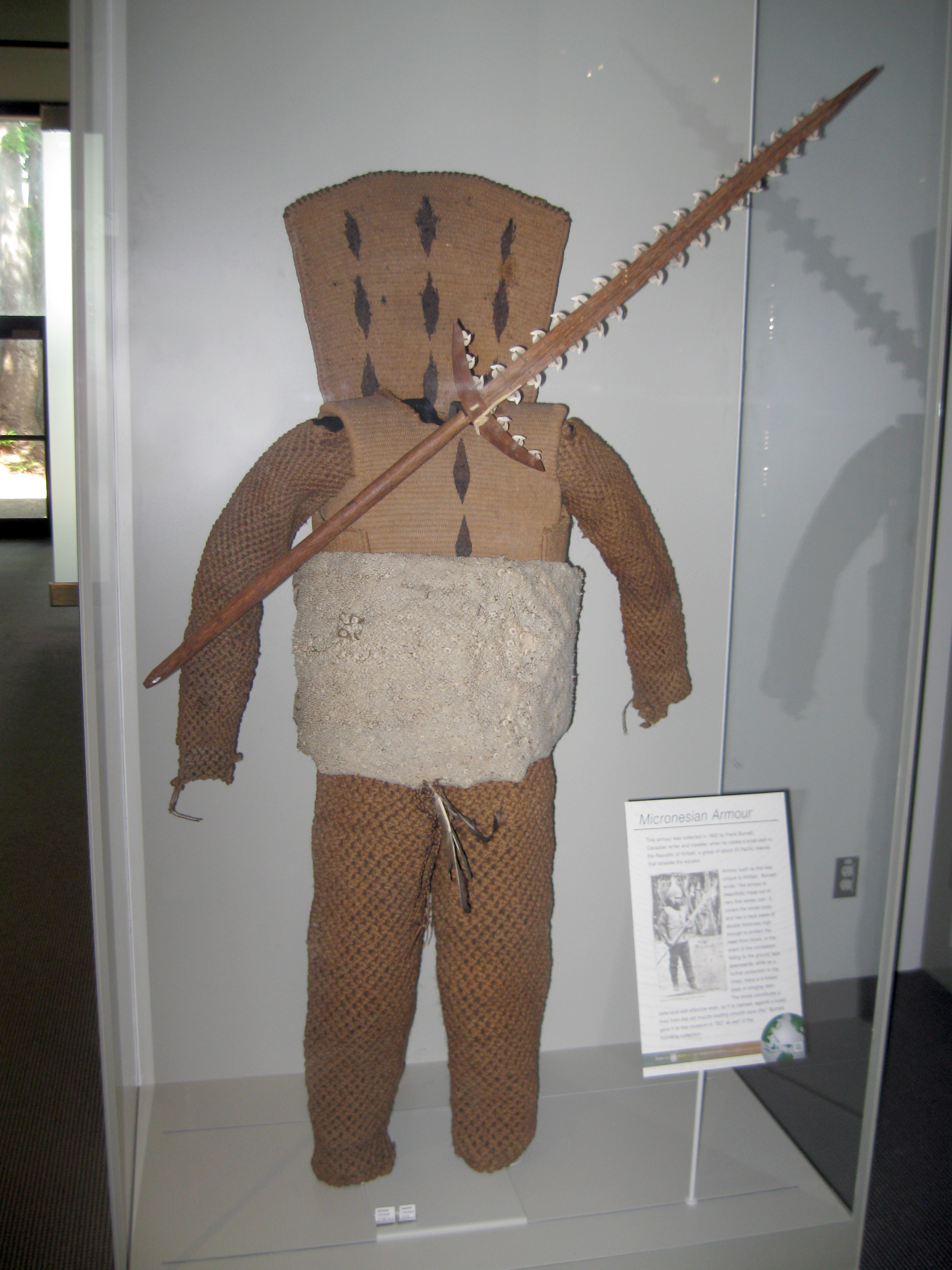
Early 20th century Micronesian armour from Kiribati.

Kiribati has been known for its traditional martial arts which were kept within the secrets of several families for generations. The Kiribati arts of fighting as opposed to Asian martial arts are not often mentioned or even advertised to be known by the general public. Though, there may be some noticeable parallels in principle to that of Asian martial arts, they are merely really different. For instance, generally, there is no kicking as in Karate kicks or Kung Fu kicks, and speed is more important than power. A list of some of these traditional martial arts is as follows: Nabakai, Nakara, Ruabou, Tabiang, Taborara, Tebania, Temata-aua, Te Rawarawanimon, and Terotauea.

The essence of Kiribati traditional martial arts is the magical power of the spirits of the ancestral warriors. All these martial arts skills share one thing in common. That is, they came from an ancestral spirit.

"Nabakai" is a martial art from the island of Abaiang originated from the person named Nabakai. Nabakai was a member of the crab clan called "Tabukaokao". The three ancestral female spirits of this clan "Nei Tenaotarai", "Nei Temwanai" and "Nei Tereiatabuki" which usually believed to manifest themselves with a female crab came to him and taught him the fighting art.

"Te Rawarawanimon" was believed to be originated from three women namely Mwangataba, Nei Wanre and Nei Karaoia who played different roles in the performance of magical rite related with the martial art, including their brother Teroa. The grave yard for Teroa is on the land named Terawarawanimon in the bush side and remains of the three sisters which are in the form of stone, cramp shell and made hole in the ground are in the village side of the same named land, Terawarawanimon. "Nabakai" and "Te Rawarawanimon" show similar resemblance of techniques except that "Nabakai" usually works with one hand and basically uses only one stance while "Te Rawarawanimon" works with two hands and has more than a dozen different stances. "Te Rawarawanimon" is a martial art from the island of North Tarawa.

"Tabiang" is a martial art from the island of Abemama. It is called "Tabiang" because it belongs to every member of the village called Tabiang on Abemama island. It uses speed and accuracy to take over an opponent. The common formula used in this form of martial art is "you give me one punch I give you four punches". It was originated from an ancestral spirit called "Terengerenge" commonly known in other versions of oral traditions as "Teraka". He became manifested by a person called "Karotu-te-buai" from Abemama island and this was the birth of "Tabiang". According to oral traditions, this ancestral spirit traveled to Asia and was a source of origin for what is now known as "karate", a reverse written form of the name "Teraka". Oral traditions state that "Kaitu" and Uakeia" conquered the whole of the southern Gilbert islands and of the northern Gilberts. Mwea, the warrior from Nikunau, he conquered Abemama prior the arrival of Kaitu and Uakeia and that is why Kaitu and Uakeia were not very serious about Abemama. They came to confirm the ownership of Mwea, whom his siblings started the kingdom of Abemama, and claimed more prior leaving the island. This explains why the king there owns a lot of land. In fact, the name Tabiang originates from Beru such as Taboiaki and Aotukia in Nonouti. "Nakara" and "Ruabou" were originated from the island of Niutao in the Ellice Islands(now called Tuvalu). Oral traditions stated that "Nakara" and "Ruabou" were adopted from the styles of "Lupe" in Niutao who derived his martial arts from his ancestral spirit, through Tikitiki who gain came from Beru.

The basics of "Nakara" and "Ruabou" work mainly on wrestling techniques. "Ruabou" applies more of wrestling and hand combat combination while "Nakara" mainly develops focus on wrestling techniques as a common saying in Kiribati states "when fighting a "Nakara" expert, never come in close contact with him." The two forms of martial arts are practiced throughout the southern Gilbert islands but originally began on the islands of Tamana and Arorae.

In 1963 Gerd Koch filmed self-defence techniques of kaunrabata (wrestling), rawebiti (defence of attacks with stabbing weapons) and rawekoro (armed attacks) on Nonouti and also filmed kaunrabata (wrestling defence), oro (defence of unarmed attacks) and rawekai (defence of armed attacks) on Onotoa.

== See also ==
- Religion in Kiribati
