= Dance in Rotuma =

Rotuman tautoga performed in 1981 commemorating Rotuma's cession to Great Britain

Dance in Rotuma refers to the traditional and modern dance styles performed by the people of the island of Rotuma, which became a dependency of Fiji in 1881. Despite Rotuma's political and historical links with Fiji, the island's culture shows strong Polynesian influences, particularly from Samoa and Tonga, which, along with Fiji, feature strongly in the history and traditions of the Rotuman people.

Situated approximately 465 km (289 mi) north of Fiji, Rotuma's relatively remote position ensures that the island still maintains major linguistic, historical, and cultural distinctions from its neighbours. However, the main styles of Rotuman dance, the Tautoga, the Mak Sa'moa and the Mak Rarotoga, show clearer influence from neighbouring cultures than most facets of the culture.

== See also ==
- Fara (Rotuman festivity)
- List of dances
