= Fakanau =

Traditional Tuvaluan male dance

A fakanau (meaning "spells") is a traditional Tuvaluan male dance, accompanied by singing and rhythmic clapping.

Fakanau singing and dancing are typical of Niutao and Nukufetau islands of Tuvalu, formerly known as the Ellice Islands, a group of nine low-lying coral islands in the central Pacific that are inhabited by Polynesian people. Fakanau is described as having "a tune that is between speech and singing [which] was performed while dancers are standing on their feet." Examples include Te onge ne tupu ia Kiollli, Neutuakina te vao i napanapa, and Ko na fakanau nei e kamata ifo mai gauta oi fakaholo atu ai ki gatai kafai te vaka e hoho ifo ki gatai. Other dances within the genre include the mako, the fakaseasea, the fatele, the lue, the sea, and the oga.

== Form ==
Male dancers performed around a circle, in a sitting position with arms, hands and upper body gestures, and all of them singing. An old dance master, at the center of the circle, kept the rhythm. In Niutao, however, the dances were performed in standing or kneeling positions. Fakanau, and fakaseasea, another form of singing and dancing performed by Tuvaluans, were specifically composed as remembrance of the rule of an "aliki or toa" and in praise of canoe building, house construction and fishing, apart from their bravery and wealth. Events were performed for a celebrity of the community and after gaining their permission, the Fakanau or fakaseasea songs were specially composed and the dances choreographed by dancers. The singing and dancing in praise of the celebrity was performed in the presence of their family and relatives; food and other items collected for the occasion were in turn presented by the celebrity, who honored the composer and dance performers. A common practice during a Fakanau is to call out spells, invocations, or beckonings. Faster than the fakaseasea and modern fatele, the dance was performed for entertainment and for ceremonies conducted in the faleaitu. However, the Fakanau would be performed in fragments during the night rather than just one dance. The content of the dances has been described as "incantations in fishing, a kind of dramatic monologue — calling to the fish, pleading, charming, even abusing — as moods are acted out."

== Genre ==
The fakanau and other dances within the genre, such as the mako and the fakaseasea, are rarely performed today, and when they are, it is for their "antiquarian" qualities. The fakanau dance type of Ellice is similar to the lue and sea of Ontong Java. The fakanau can be compared to the oga, a typical women's dance, which also included songs and was performed in a sitting position or kneeling position. In 1992, Hoëm classified fakanau as being an "instrumental" genre, while kakai ("folk tales") was classified as recreational entertainment; the two are considered to be polar opposites.

== History ==
At one time, this form of dancing was performed in places of worship, known as faleaitu (meaning: "house for gods") as an expression of gratitude to the gods and also during community activities. Over time, many of the Fakanau dancers earned a high degree of respect in their communities through their dancing skills. The fakanau dance was regarded as a social evil on Tuvalu after the arrival of Christian ministers as the wide swaying by the men was considered erotic to the women. Regarded as evil dancing, fakanau eventually disappeared.

Professor Gerd Koch, anthropologist and ethnomusicologist and author of the book “Songs of Tuvalu”, revived a fakanau in 1960 amongst the Niutao islanders. Influenced by early missionaries, the song had been mostly forgotten by islanders. The simple song was sung as dedication to the Niutao's voyage by paddling in a large canoe, known in local language as vaca lasi, to the sea during high tide. During this tidal stage, they encountered another canoe. At the high pitch of the tide they encountered another similar canoe with men whom when hailed did not reply back. The Niutao were very much disturbed by the non response from the other canoe and hence presumed that the men in the other boat were gods. Then in a hurry they paddled to their village.

“Te foe, te fo kia atua!

The paddle, the paddle of the gods!

Te foe, te fo kia tagata!

The paddle, the paddle of the men!

Pili te foe, mau te foe!

Take the paddle, seize the paddle!

E, taku foe! E, taku foe!

Oh, my paddle! Oh, my paddle!”

This song was revived, at Koch's initiative, by the old men of Niutuao. They considered this song as an ancient legacy of their ancestors. Tinilau Matolu, an 83-year-old man (born around 1877), said that he had learned it in 1902 from Kaisami, Tepae, Temaalo and Poulasi, who were older than he is. The song was rehearsed for 11 days by Tinilau and his old friends whose age averaged 67. They set it to a fast rhythm in three verses with fast clapping in support of the song. The final version was sung on 13 September by 18 men (their average age was 56) with Katea (52 years of age and who had visited Samoa and Fiji Islands as crew member of a ship) in the lead. They recorded the song with great verve and enthusiasm. The song became a rage, like pop music, among both old and young people of Niutao, including children, for several months. It was made into a 16 mm film in October 1960. In July 1963, the song was rerecorded with six old men singing. Several more Kakanau dance songs related to love and god were also recorded and also broadcast over Radio Tuvalu.

== See also ==
- Fatele
- Fakaseasea
- Music of Tuvalu
