= Fakaseasea =

Traditional Tuvaluan dance

The fakaseasea is a tradition dance song of Tuvalu. Dancing songs are the most common type of the traditional Tuvaluan songs, with other tradition dance styles including fakanau and fatele.

== Tuvaluan dance music ==
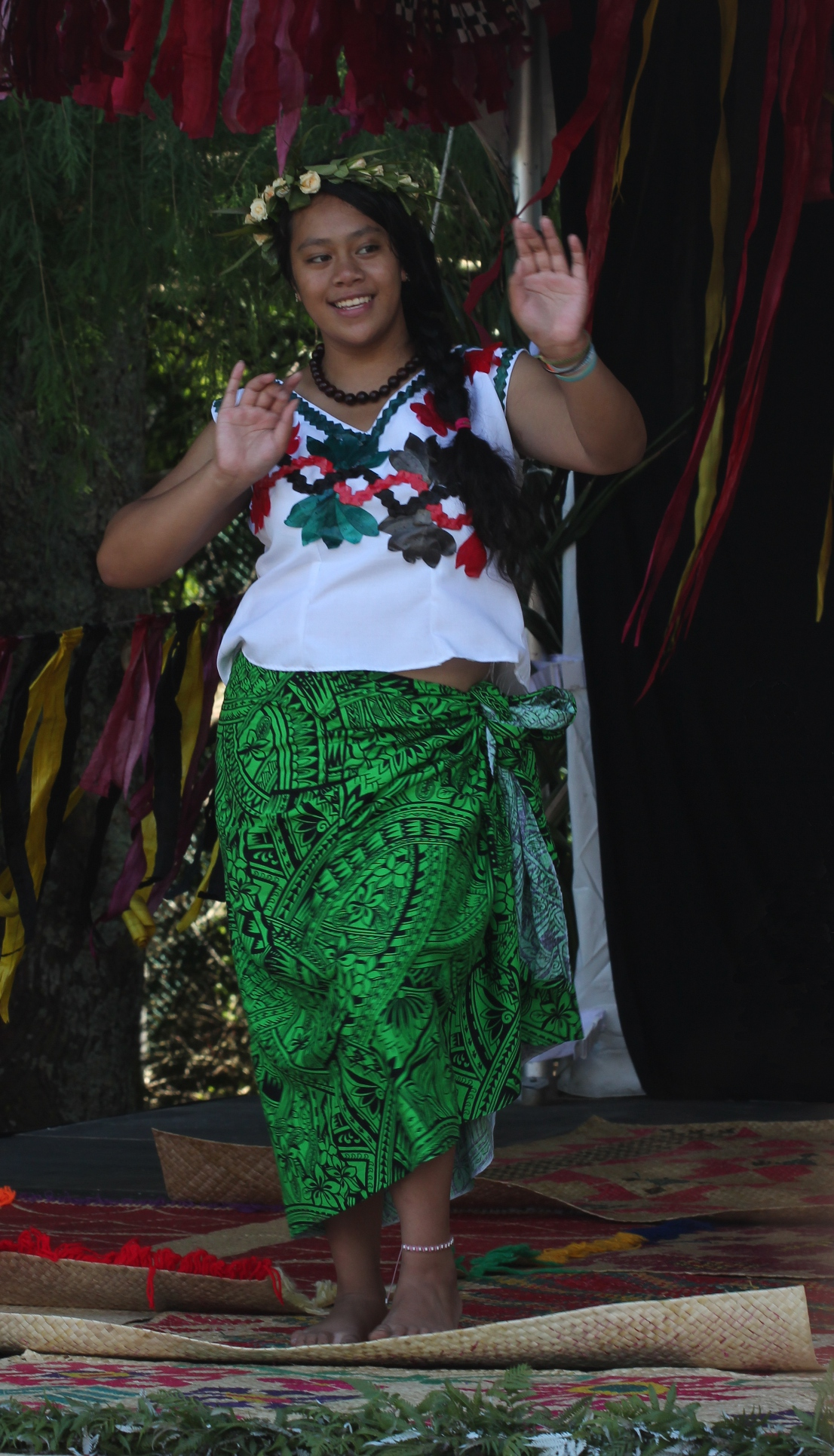
A Tuvaluan dancer at Auckland's Pasifika Festival

Dancing songs are the most common type of traditional Tuvaluan songs. Older style dancing songs were known to be performed while sitting, kneeling or standing. The two primary traditional dances of Tuvalu are the fakanau (for men) and oga (for women) and the fakaseasea. The modern fatele involves the women on their feet, dancing in lines; with the men facing the dancers, sitting on the floor beating the time with their hands on the mats or on wooden boxes, such as tea chests.

== Performance of the fakaseasea ==
The fakaseasea was mainly performed by women, who were on their feet, dancing and moving their arms, hand and upper body; while men and women would sing and beat the time. It is a slower song with very loose rules on how to dance to it, with variations on different islands with different names. The fakaseasea tradition continues in the present day although performed mainly by elders.
