= Fa'ataupati =

Indigenous Samoan dance

The Fa'ataupati is a dance indigenous to Samoans. In English it is simply the "Samoan Slap Dance". It was developed in Samoa in the 19th century and is only performed by males.

== History ==
The word pati in Fa'ataupati means "to clap", Fa'ataupati means to 'forcefully clap or to slap'.

Dances in Samoa would reflect on everyday life activities. In the 19th century there was an invasion of mosquitoes to the Kingdom, which later on became another part of everyday life, and it was there that the Fa'ataupati was created from when a man would forcefully slap his body. This dance mimics a person slapping the mosquitoes off their body when bitten.

From then on it became part of the Samoan culture.

== Performance ==
The Fa'ataupati is traditionally performed by a group of men and requires strength and stability. The men would clap and slap in sync with each other. This dance is the only dance in Samoa that does not require any instrument, as the slapping of the bodies, the clapping of the hands and stomping of the feet create the music for this dance. It is the only all-male dance in Samoa.

The Fa'ataupati is rarely performed alone. This dance requires a lot of coconut oil rubbed on the skin, as the slapping can sometimes leave marks on one's body.

== Use in Mainstream New Zealand Dance ==
Fa'ataupati has been used by one of New Zealand's leading contemporary dance companies; Black Grace, in their dances Minoi and Minoi 2.
