= Kato'aga =

Term in the Rotuman language

Kato'aga is a broad term in the Rotuman language to describe the ceremonies and gatherings of Rotuman culture. In particular, it refers to the ceremonies involved in celebrating the achievements of people of high rank, or identifying their elevation to important positions of authority within Fiji or internationally. Kato'aga have been held for Chief Justice Daniel Fatiaki upon elevation to being the head of Judiciary of Fiji, and to Major General George Konrote when he became Commander of UNIFIL.
