= Tea chest =

Wooden case used to transport tea

Tea chest

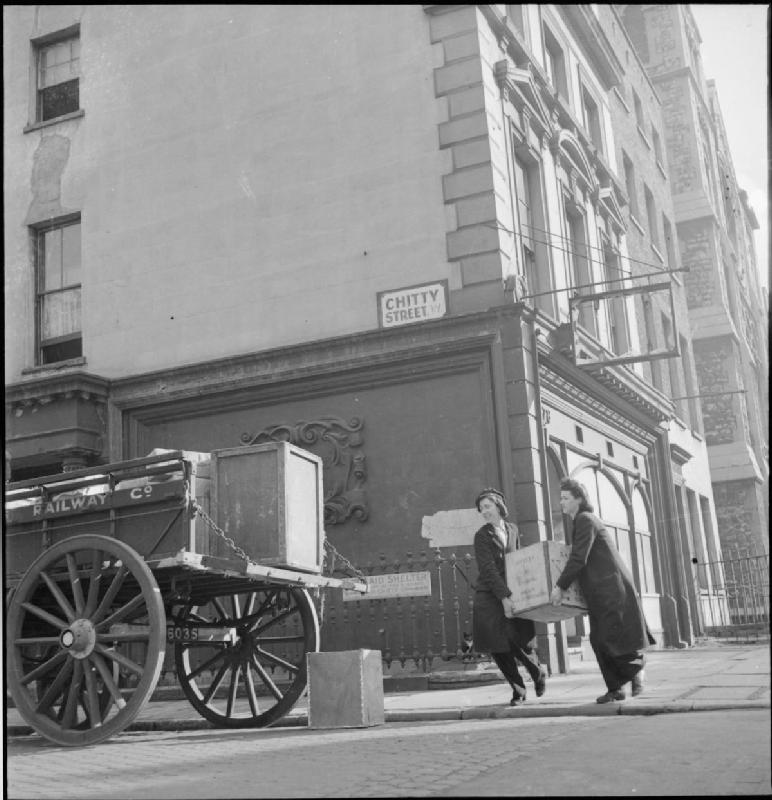
Two women in London carry a tea chest to a wagon, 1943

A tea chest is a type of wooden case originally produced and used to ship tea to the United Kingdom, Australia, Canada, and New Zealand. The conventional tea chest is a case with riveted metal edges, of approximate size 500 by 500 by 750 millimetres (20 by 20 by 30 in).

Modern tea chests (2023) are made of plywood with metal corners and lined with aluminium foil and parchment paper to provide aroma-proof packaging. They are generally shipped in shipping containers, so modern tea chests are commonly dimensioned to fit in standard shipping containers.

The term is now used widely to indicate similarly sized cases, including corrugated boxes, produced for various home and commercial uses.

Wooden tea caddies are also occasionally referred to as "tea chests".

A tea chest holds 42 to 58 kilograms of tea; the size depends on the origin and client. Sizes vary from 400×400×620 to 500×500×750 mm.

== History ==
The traditional construction was of very thin wood held at the edges with metal edges, riveted to the sheets. Internally, tea chests were often lined with metal foil, and strengthened with inch-by-inch boards at the edges.

The foil was stated as lead in a Bushell's 1925 advertisement but later changed to aluminium foil.

Tea chests were only used to carry tea once, so they were generally sold for non-food use. They would often be subsequently used for domestic goods storage and house contents moving as they were low cost, light weight, robust and clean.

During the 1950s throughout the UK, tea chests began to be used as basic basses in skiffle groups, such as the Quarrymen.

Due to containerisation of shipping and the availability of dry vented containers, the use of tea chests for shipping tea declined in the late 20th century. By the second decade of the 21st century, although tea chests were still used in some cases, tea is most commonly transported in sacks, either polyethylene or multi layer paper, stacked on pallets and packed into clean dry vented shipping containers.

== See also ==
- Crate
- Milk crate
- Tea lead
