= Sasa (dance) =

Samoan folk dance

Sasa, also spelled sāsā, is a type of folk dance from Samoa. Sasa is performed by all ages and genders, usually in groups and while seated. The word "sāsā" literally means "to strike", and is characterized by precise, rhythmic claps and intricate hand movements. The movements of sasa often depict Samoan practices and history, with individual gestures representing actions from everyday life, such as cooking, paddling canoes, or cleaning.

== History ==
The origin and evolution of sasa is unclear, owing to poor documentation by researchers. A dance by the name of sasa is first mentioned in the academic literature in Buck's field notes from 1927–28, but his descriptions more closely resemble a different Samoan dance, usually referred to as siva lapalapa.

The word sasa literally means 'to strike'. The dance was originally a village activity, but it soon became one of Samoa's most well-known dances. It was traditionally performed by whole villages in order to give a perfect effect on the viewers- the more performers, the more the dance became effective.

Sa'a is cognate with other words found across Polynesia often used to describe local dance forms, such as Māori haka, Hawaiian ha'a, etc.

== Performance ==
Generally, the sasa is performed by a large group of people, it is normally performed sitting down, but there are parts of the dance which require the group to stand up. The movements depict everyday life, from the movement of fish in the water, to the flying birds in the sky, from cooking the umu to cleaning the house, and even a form of voyaging, where the group move into the form of a large canoe, having the arms on the outside mimic the movement of paddles in the water.

Every Sasa is different, some movements have never changed, however nowadays, more contemporary moves are now being added to the Sasa. The Samoa 'ava ceremony is always included in the Sasa where the group would mimic the Taupōu making 'ava.

A Sasa will always begin with the fa'aluma yelling tulolo which tells the group to bow their heads, and nofo for the group to sit up again, in a Sasa you will hear chants like "Talofa" (greetings) at the beginning and "Tofa" (farewell) at the end or easier, fa.
