= Taualuga =

Traditional Samoan dance

The Taualuga is a traditional Samoan dance, considered the apex of Samoan performance art and the centerpiece of the culture of Samoa. This dance form has been adopted and adapted throughout western Polynesia, most notably in Samoa, The Kingdom of Tonga, Uvea, Futuna, and Tokelau. The Tongan version is called the tau'olunga.

== History ==
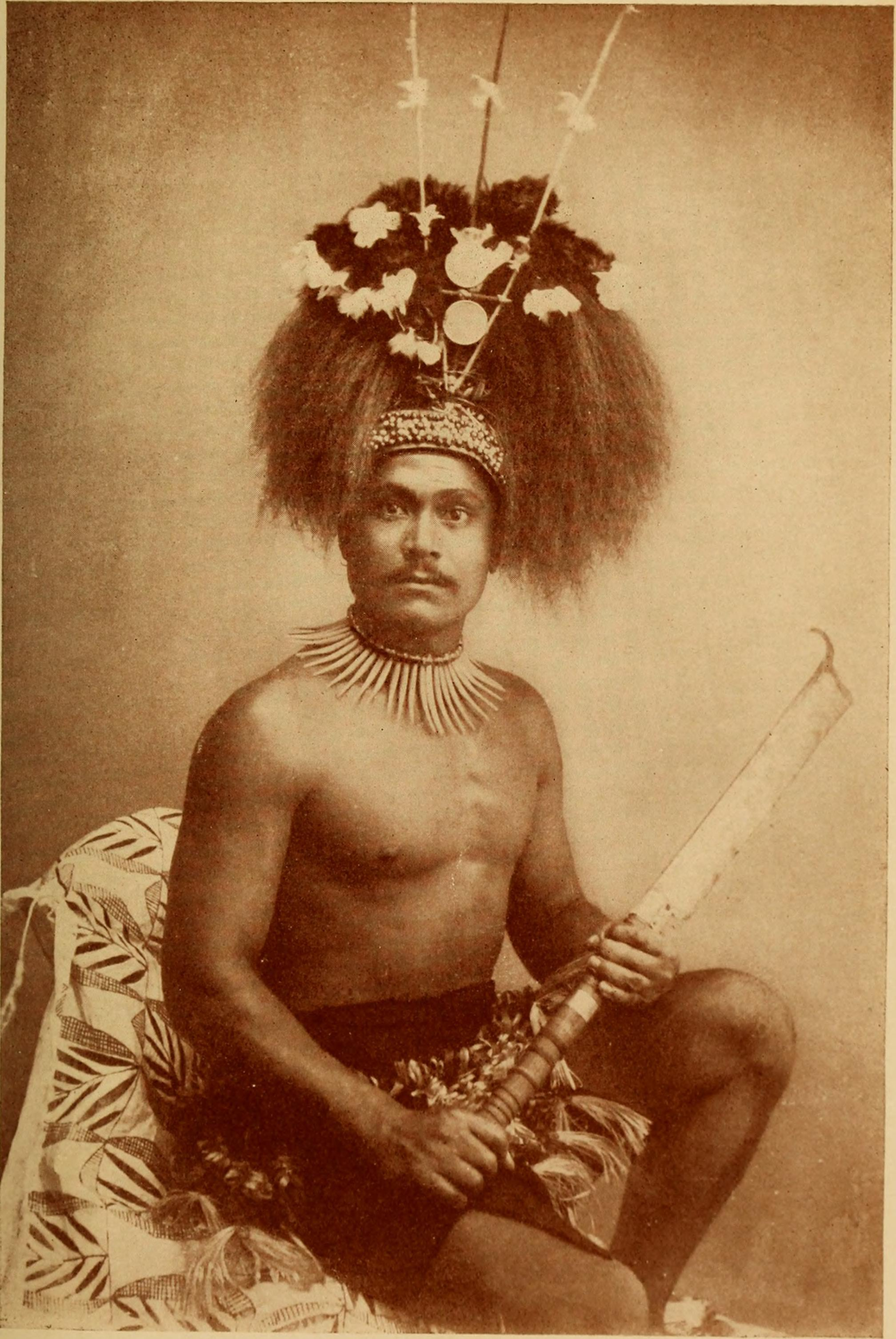
Portrait of a manaia

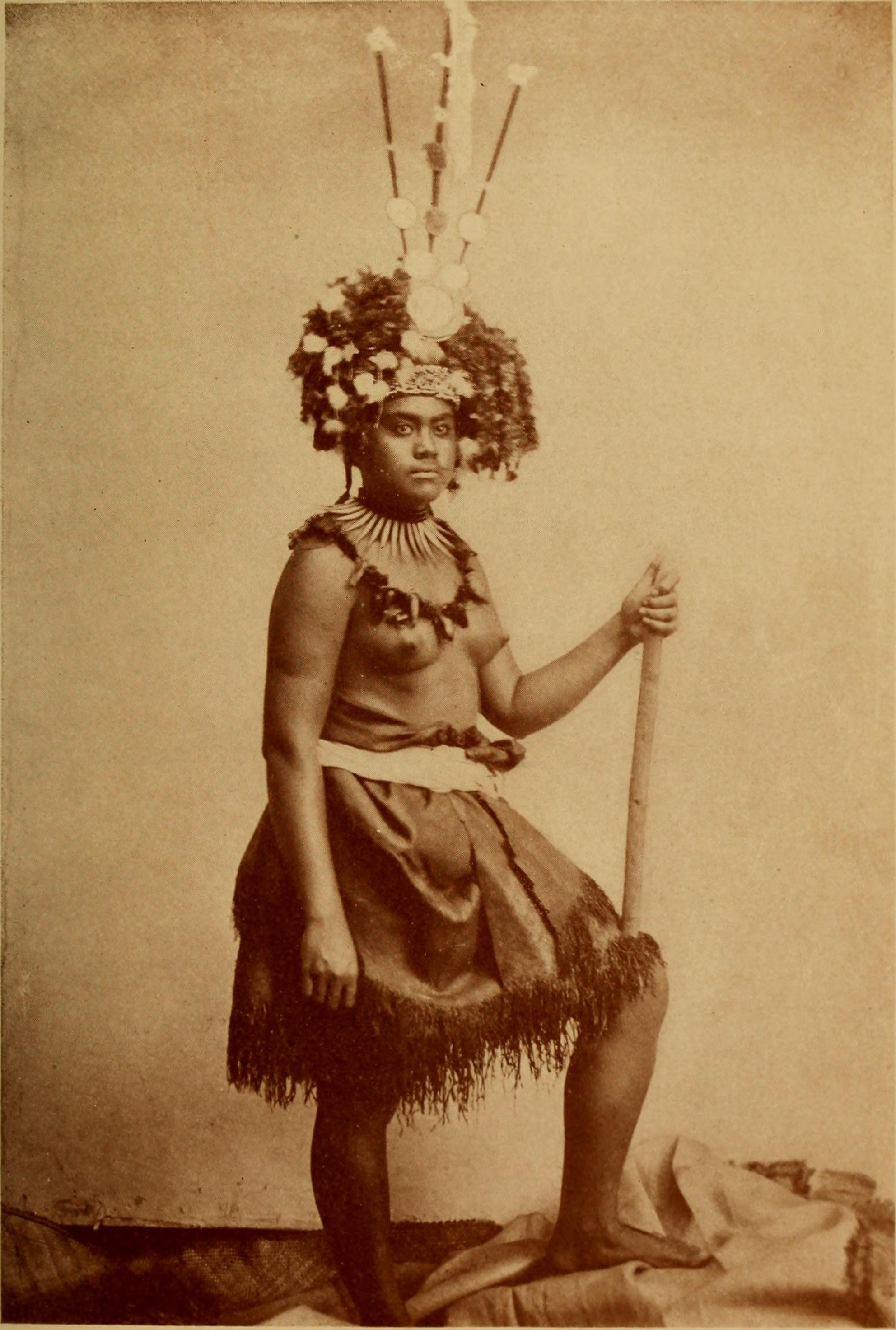
Portrait of a taupou

The word Taualuga in Samoan refers to the last stage of traditional house building in which the topmost rafter was secured to the building (fale), signifying the completion of construction. The term thus symbolizes the conclusion of a monumental task and the beautifying final touches involved. The dance is frequently performed as the grand finale of an evening of entertainment or as the concluding number at Samoan wedding receptions, social functions, and other festivities.

Traditionally, the Taualuga is performed by the son or daughter of a chief. Each village in Samoa is autonomous and led by a council of matai referred to as the 'village fono.' The daughter of a high chief in a village is known as a "taupou" or "sa'o'aualuma" when they perform public ceremonial roles; the male equivalent is known as the "manaia", or "sa'o'aumaga." However, Taupou in certain districts consist of important individual female names or titles under Samoa's traditional social hierarchy and form of governance, the Fa'amatai chiefly system.

This dance is sacred to the Samoan people and traditionally only virgins were allowed to perform it. Today virginity is not necessarily a prerequisite and although older adults and even teenage mothers are occasionally seen performing the final dance, a strong preference for unmarried performers is still the norm. The manaia could perform the Taualuga if the High Chief had no daughters, but the performance of a chief's son was often in jest; a manaia's performance was not held to the same strict standards of elegance and refinement required of a taupou and did not hold the same sociocultural significance of that of the taupou. The taupou held the role of "sa'o'aualuma" or the leader of the unmarried women of the community; she was accompanied by a retinue of her peers wherever she went and was constantly under the protective watch of designated "tausi" or older women of the village whose sole responsibility was to preserve the virtue and reputation of their chief's prized daughter. The taupou was raised from youth in the arts of hospitality, cultural rituals and ceremonies, chiefly protocol and demeanor, and the intricacies of the fine arts of dancing, the pinnacle of which was the taualuga.

There are exceptions when the taualuga is not performed as a finale, such as during a religious celebration or dedication of a church when the taualuga might be seen as a secular activity that might detract from the sacredness or spiritual nature of the religious observance. Conversely, it is common for a parishioner dressed as a taupou to dance and lead the procession in some Samoan Catholic congregations. On all other social occasions the taualuga is usually the last dance to be performed.

== Traditional dress ==
The highborn son or daughter of a Samoan chief would dress in full festive regalia for a taualuga performance. This usually consisted of a traditional finely woven ‘ie toga mat, decorated with the prized feathers of the "sega" (collared lory or blue-crowned lorikeet), that was wrapped around the body. The mat was secured with a tapa sash called a "vala" or "fusi" and it was not uncommon for several layers of mats and tapa to be worn. Today, most fine mats are bordered with dyed chicken feathers, far larger and less delicate than the traditional mats now seen only very rarely in Samoa, and only in museums and private collections abroad. Both the dancer and the mats were generously anointed with scented coconut oil to give a cosmetic sheen.

Samoan oral history maintains that dance wear for aristocratic Samoans was also painstakingly crafted from other natural materials, such as skirts made of "sega" feathers ("iefulu" or "'ofu'ula") or dresses composed of flower petals and leaves ("la'ei" or "'ofumeamata"). Anklets and armbands made of ti leaves, sea turtle shell ("uga laumei" or "uga fonu"), coconut shell, and/or boar's tusks adorned the dancer and the ensemble was completed with a necklace of cut whale's teeth ("ulalei") or boar's tusks ("ulanifo"). The "ulalei" was once an article of jewelry exclusive to the aristocracy and very few examples are still known today outside of museums; today's "ulalei" and "ulanifo" are, for the most part, mere replicas made of plastic pipe, coconut shell, or carved animal bone.

The crowning attire of the taupou or manaia was the traditional headdress known as the "tuiga." Coconut midribs ("tuaniu") wrapped with strips of tapa cloth were secured to a faceplate ("lave") made of turtle shell in such a way that the midribs stood upright when the faceplate was tied to the hair above the forehead; the hair was pulled upward into a tight topknot called the "foga" which was then tightly wrapped with tapa into a stiff cone to which the faceplate was tied. The earliest mention of "tuiga" refers to a headdress that was made with an intricately carved vertical "comb" called a "selu tuiga" (literally, "standing up comb"); this teeth of the "selu" were stuck into the hair at the base of the "foga," to which coconut midribs and long tropicbird ("tava'e") feathers were attached. This seems to be the form of the most ancient "tuiga" before the "selu" comb and "tava'e" feathers were replaced by the mother of pearl shell "lave" and "sega" feathers, that has now been supplanted by mirrors, sequins and dyed chicken feathers. The second component of the tuiga was the "pale fuiono," literally "the headband of nautilus shells," made of rows of pearlized nautilus shells tied to a woven headband. Often two or more "pale fuiono" were tied around the wearer's forehead. The third component was the hair ornament, essentially a large wig fashioned from the hair of female relatives. The hair was washed in salt water and dyed with coral lime and citrus juice to give the hair a reddish-brown color, and the strands were tied together to form the "ie lau'ulu" which was tied to the top of the cone that the "lave" faceplate was tied to. The last piece of the tuiga was the "ie'ula" (literally, "red dress") which consisted of strands of tiny red collared lory feathers. Today, the 'ie'ula is generally made of large colorful chicken feathers that are dyed any variety of hues besides the traditional red and white. Modern tuiga headbands also stray from the original design and the use of real "fuiono" nautilus shells is almost obsolete, even in Samoa, where the headband replicas are now fashioned with non-traditional materials such as sequins, rhinestones, and common shells such as cowries. Furthermore, the traditional multi-piece tuiga is almost never seen, having been almost completely replaced with modern one-piece replicas that resemble tall hats, complete with velcro flaps that wrap around the head and attach in the back. This contemporary version of the ancient tuiga also uses materials that were never used traditionally, such as glass mirrors, faux jewels and pearls, plastic mesh and chicken feathers. The one-piece construction and gawdy decorations of most modern tuiga are a far cry from the stately, natural multi-piece tuiga of old Samoa.

In cases when the tuiga was not worn, the "pale fuiono" was usually worn with the "ie'ula" feather ornament tied to dangle from the back or side of the dancer's head. Photos and accounts from the first European visitors to Samoa mention taupou who wore ornate garlands of flowers, leaves and ferns around their heads, as well as taupou and manaia who wore tall, delicately carved combs ("selu") in their hair for public appearances.

== The 'Ailao and Nifo'oti ==
Contemporary taualuga performances sometimes commence with choreographies involving a hooked bladed implement called the "nifo'oti." While taupou and manaia did indeed dance and twirl war clubs ("anava") when leading processions or concluding performances this segment should not be misconstrued as a component of the taualuga. The brandishing of the "nifo'oti" originates with the ancient spectacle of twirling, throwing and mock-fighting with heirloom clubs called "anava" - this performance was called "ailao" and it was a common pre-battle ritual. Some have wrongly translated the word "nifo'oti" as "tooth of death" although this has been shown to be linguistically and culturally inaccurate; the modern "nifo'oti" is based on the carved wooden warclub called the "anava." The "anava" and "talavalu" were Samoan clubs that were carved with serrated or braced edges capable of dismembering or decapitating foes. When European whalers and entrepreneurs introduced the steel blubber knife and cane knife these blades were quickly adapted as warclubs and used for "ailao" dancing and warfare. The single hook or prong was reminiscent of a goat's horn (goats were introduced to Samoa at the same time as metal blades) and so the knives became known as "nifo'oti" ("nifo"= horn, "'oti" = goat). Without the glottal stop the term "nifooti" means "dead tooth" or "dead horn," and could not be misconstrued to mean "tooth of death." The most accurate translation of the term is probably "cutting teeth," employing the verb 'oti ("to cut," as in "otiulu" = "haircut"). The "ailao" is performed before the actual taualuga as an exhibition of the dancer's skill, dexterity, grace, and coordination. It is symbolic of the former significance that the taupou had in her role as the leader of ceremonial processions, dances, rituals, and war parties.

== Performance ==
The Taualuga (unlike the Tongan Tau'olunga) is a solo performance. The dance was accompanied by choral music and simple percussion such as the slit gong or rolled mats that were beaten with sticks. Singers, directed by a conductor known as "fuataimi" or "fa'aluma," generally sat in rows or concentric semicircles around the dance area. The Samoan taualuga is known for its graceful refinement, subtle hand and facial gestures, and the stately poise of the dancers movements and postures. The elegant nature of the dance is emphasized by the contrasting "aiuli" or "fa'aluma" performers who, often spontaneously, dance alongside and behind the taupou with exaggerated gestures, loud vocalizations, and humorous antics. It is a universal practice for modern Samoans to "lafo" -- throw money onto the floor or into the air above the dancer—or place money on the dancer in acknowledgment of her skill and status. For this reason many people confuse the taualuga with money dances such as those performed among Filipino and some Latino and European communities. The "lafo" custom, however, does not share the fundraising origins of money dances, although it does reflect the former tradition of presenting fine mats and tapa cloth at festive occasions that were concluded with the taualuga.
