= List of Oceanic and Australian folk music traditions =

This is a list of folk music traditions, with styles, dances, instruments and other related topics. The term folk music can not be easily defined in a precise manner; it is used with widely varying definitions depending on the author, intended audience and context within a work. Similarly, the term traditions in this context does not connote any strictly defined criteria. Music scholars, journalists, audiences, record industry individuals, politicians, nationalists and demagogues may often have occasion to address which fields of folk music are distinct traditions based along racial, geographic, linguistic, religious, tribal or ethnic lines, and all such peoples will likely use different criteria to decide what constitutes a "folk music tradition". This list uses the same general categories used by mainstream, primarily English-language, scholarly sources, as determined by relevant statements of fact and the internal structure of works.

These traditions may coincide entirely, partially or not at all with geographic, political, linguistic or cultural boundaries. Very few, if any, music scholars would claim that there are any folk music traditions that can be considered specific to a distinct group of people and with characteristics undiluted by contact with the music of other peoples; thus, the folk music traditions described herein overlap in varying degrees with each other.

== Oceania and Australia ==
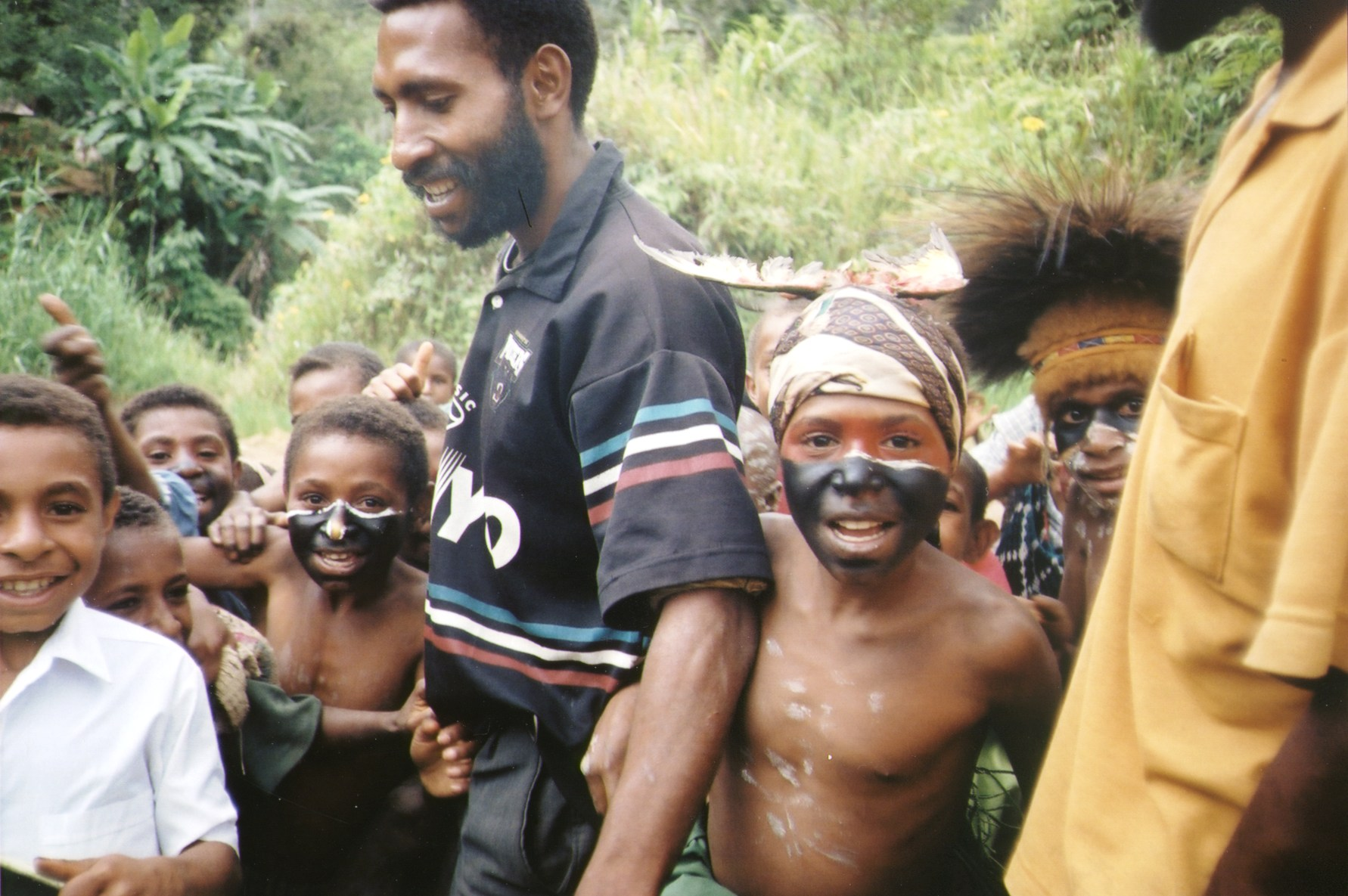
Children at a sing-sing in Papua New Guinea

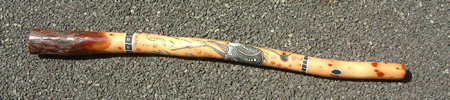
An indigenous Australian instrument, the didgeridoo

| Country | Elements | Dance | Instrumentation | Other topics |
|---|---|---|---|---|
| White Australian | bush ballad - country music | bush dance | lagerphone - wobbleboard | |
| Indigenous Australian | | Wangga dance | didgeridoo | songline |
| Cook Islander | imene metua - imene tuki | | koauau - paatere - purerehua | |
| Easter Islander | | | kauaha - upaupa | |
| Fiji | | meke i wau - meke iri - meke wesi - seasea - vakamalolo | derua - slit drum | |
| Hawaiian | hula - kepakepa - mele - oli | hula | ipu - pahu - puniu - rattle | |
| Maori | | haka - poi | | |
| Marquesas Islander | | haka puaka | | |
| Marshall Islander | | Jebua | | |
| Papua New Guinea | string band | | garamut - kundu - rattle - susap | haus tambaran - sing-sing |
| Samoan | hiva usu | fa'ataupati - ma'ulu'ulu - sasa - siva Samoa | lali - logo - nafa - pandanus - pate | ali'i - fiafia - tulafale |
| Solomon Islander | | | panpipe | |
| Tahiti | himene tarava | 'aparima - 'ote'a | slit drum | |
| Tongan | action-song - hiva kakala - kava papalangi | lakalaka - me'etu'upaki - 'otuhaka - ula | conch - lali - nose-flute - nafa | faikava - fiafia - hulohula |
| Tuvalu | | fatele | | |

== See also ==
- Polynesian music
- Micronesian music
- Australian aboriginal music

== Sources ==
- Broughton, Simon (2000). Mark Ellingham (ed.). Rough Guide to World Music (First ed.). London: Rough Guides. ISBN 1-85828-636-0.
- Manuel, Peter (1988). Popular Musics of the Non-Western World. New York: Oxford University Press. ISBN 0-19-505342-7.
- Philip V. Bohlman; Bruno Nettl; Charles Capwell; Thomas Turino; Isabel K. F. Wong (1997). Excursions in World Music (Second ed.). Prentice Hall. ISBN 0-13-230632-8.
- Fujie, Linda; James T. Koetting; David P. McAllester; David B. Reck; John M. Schechter; Mark Slobin; R. Anderson Sutton (1992). Jeff Todd Titon (ed.). Worlds of Music: An Introduction to the Music of the World's Peoples (Second ed.). New York: Schirmer Books. ISBN 0-02-872602-2.
- "International Dance Glossary". World Music Central. Archived from the original on 7 February 2006.
