= Music of Tonga =

Music of Tonga refers to music derived from the island Tonga in the islands of Polynesia. Music of Tonga today generally falls under the category of traditional music that has withstood the test of time, or into one of the two opposing genres of religious and secular music. Tongan music can be either very emotional and somewhat modern with instrumental makeup including modern brass instruments, or conversely can be more traditional and consist of only drums and voices. In this way, Tongan music is very diverse despite the fact that it is contained to a fairly low populated island group, which means that the different cultures and styles co-exist together without blending.

== Colonial History ==
Tonga was invaded by European explorers in 1616. Early invaders, such as Captain Cook in the 1770s, and William Mariner in the 19th century, describe traditional dance performances featuring singing and drumming.

The first proselytizing religious zealots, English Methodists, arrived in 1822. By 1830, most of the population were nominally Christian. Western church music and Western classical and popular music would then start to mingle with the pure Tongan music, resulting in the often hybrid music of contemporary Tonga. Now popular guitar styles are used throughout Tonga too.

== Surviving traditional music ==
Traditional music is preserved (though how faithfully we can only guess) in the set pieces performed at royal and noble weddings and funerals, and in the song sung during the traditional ceremony of apology, the lou-ifi.

Radio Tonga begins each day's broadcast with a recording from Veʻehala, a nobleman and celebrated virtuoso of the nose flute. The nose flute is otherwise rarely heard. Contemporary youth prefers the guitar.

Some ancient dances are still performed, such as ula, ʻotuhaka and meʻetuʻupaki.

The lali or slit-gong, is still in use—as a substitute for a church bell by congregations that cannot afford a bell.

In the late 19th century, missionaries introduced hymns popular in England and Australia at the time, keeping the Western tunes and translating the lyrics into Tongan. These hymns are still sung in the largest Methodist church, the Free Wesleyan Church of Tonga.

Other Christian denominations have introduced their own musical traditions. The Roman Catholic church in Tonga, while a minority church, has been notable for its accepting attitude towards traditional Tongan culture. Their church music, however, follows Western Catholic models.

In the smaller churches and the minority Methodist sects, hymn singing is unaccompanied, hiva usu. A strong singer will sing the first notes alone (a practice called hua or opening) and the rest of the congregation will then join. Church choirs are popular, practice is frequent, and most congregations sing all hymns in harmony.

Free Wesleyan Churches feature not only choirs, but brass bands. It is possible that this tradition comes from northern England, a strongly Methodist area, where participating in brass bands is a popular amusement. Visitors may regret that the blaring bands drown out the delicate harmonies of the hymns, but Tongans glory in the size and splendor of their bands as they do the size and splendor of their churches. Smaller churches have no bands, but aspire to them.

All the Methodist churches have occasional choir exhibitions (po hiva), held in the larger churches, to which all the neighboring congregations are invited. Choirs practice assiduously to show off their prowess before their rivals. Handel's Hallelujah Chorus is frequently sung at these festivals, being esteemed as the epitome of choir display.

Hymn-singing is greatly practiced at the wakes before funerals. Relatives sit with the body, while mourners come to make their last greetings to the departed and to bring gifts to the bereaved. The church choir (from the family's own congregation) sits in the background, singing hymns through the day and night.

== Secular music ==
Secular music is composed in a gamut of styles, ranging from the semi-traditional to the aggressively "pop" influenced by overseas styles. The usual instruments are voice, guitar, and sometimes the players from the church brass band.

Hiva kakala (fragrant songs, meaning love poems) are an important part of the semi-traditional group. Many of the ones still popular nowadays were made by queen Sālote in the 1950s and are the favourite tunes for the tauʻolunga dances. Another important part in this group are the more formal songs, slanted towards odes to the chiefs and the royal family. They are the ideal choice for dances like the māʻuluʻulu or the lakalaka, Tonga's national dance form.

Mixed dancing, or hulohula as practiced at parties and clubs in the Western world, is still comparatively rare. It is not a feature of village life, and can be found only in the cities, such as Nukuʻalofa.

Most village musicians display their talents only in church, or at the koniseti. The koniseti or concert is a display of dance and song, usually done as a fundraiser for some worthy cause, such as a sports team or a local congregation. The musicians consist usually of singers, guitar players, and possibly a church brass band. The music is melodic and minor key; it serves as background to the dancers. Sometimes villagers will rehearse a koniseti for months and then tour neighboring villages or even islands. The size of the receipts is commensurate with the quality of the show, and there is great incentive to excel. At other times the koniseti may be performed only once, for a special occasion.

Music is often heard in Tongan towns and villages, but it is usually music from Radio Tonga. Radio Tonga is a state-run radio station; it starts broadcasting early in the morning and ends late at night. It can be heard even in the smallest villages on the remotest islands, blasting from the omnipresent tepis or combination radio/tape cassette players (usually battery powered). One weary Western visitor was heard to complain, in 1980, "You can't get away from Radio Tonga".

Radio Tonga plays music from local Tongan musical groups, Fijian and Samoan bands, Hawaiʻian music, etc. It also broadcasts church services and choir competitions, so it disseminates church music as well as popular music. The Tongan groups usually feature strong vocals, solo or choral, haunting minor key harmonies, and guitar backup. To the unsophisticated Western ear, it savors of American country music.

Western pop is also popular among a younger audience, though disapproved by elders and churches. It can bought as CD or tape, seen on DVD or videotape, picked up on short-wave radio, viewed in movie theatres, or even watched on the one TV station, broadcasting from the capital city of Nukuʻalofa. However, government censors significantly limit what can be imported, or played.

Local custom also plays a part. It is forbidden to mention sexual topics in front of men and women who have a brother-sister relationship. This applies not only to brothers and sisters by Western reckoning, but also to cousins. Hence sexual references are taboo in most public situations where both men and women are present.

Contemporary Tongan pop music has reached outside Tonga, but only to the Tongan diaspora in the United States, Australia, and New Zealand.

No Tongan artists have achieved a cross-over hit. However, the Jets, an R&B/pop octet of the mid-1980s, had a string of hits on the American charts. The Minneapolis-based act consists of eight brothers and sisters whose mother and father had emigrated to the U.S. from Tonga.

== See also ==
- Tongan music notation
- Music of Polynesia
- Bill Sevesi
- Bill Wolfgramm
