= Music of the Cook Islands =

The music of the Cook Islands is diverse, with Christian music being especially popular. Imene tuki is a form of unaccompanied vocal music known for its uniquely Polynesian drop in pitch at the end of phrases, along with staccato rhythmic bursts of nonsensical syllables called tuki. The word 'imene' is derived from the English word 'hymn' (see Tahitian: 'himene' — Tahiti was first colonised by the English). Likewise, the harmonies and tune characteristics, known as strophe patterns, of much Polynesian music are Western in style, deriving from missionaries through hymns and other Church music. One unique quality of Polynesian music — now almost a cliché — is the use of the sustained sixth chord in vocal music, although this chord is typically not found in religious music. Traditional songs and hymns are referred to as imene metua (lit. hymn of the parent/ancestor).

Traditional dance is the most prominent art form of the Cook Islands. Each island has its own unique dances that are taught to all children, and each island is home to several annual competitions. Traditional dances are generally accompanied by the drumming of the pate.

The Cook Islands drumming style is well known internationally, but is often misidentified as an example of Tahitian music. This is most uncommon as the Cook Islands have a strong connection to their Tahitian ancestry.

Harmony-singing church music and a wide variety of hymns, wedding songs, and funeral music are found throughout the Cook Islands. There is much variation across the region, and each island has its own traditional songs.
