= Music of Samoa =

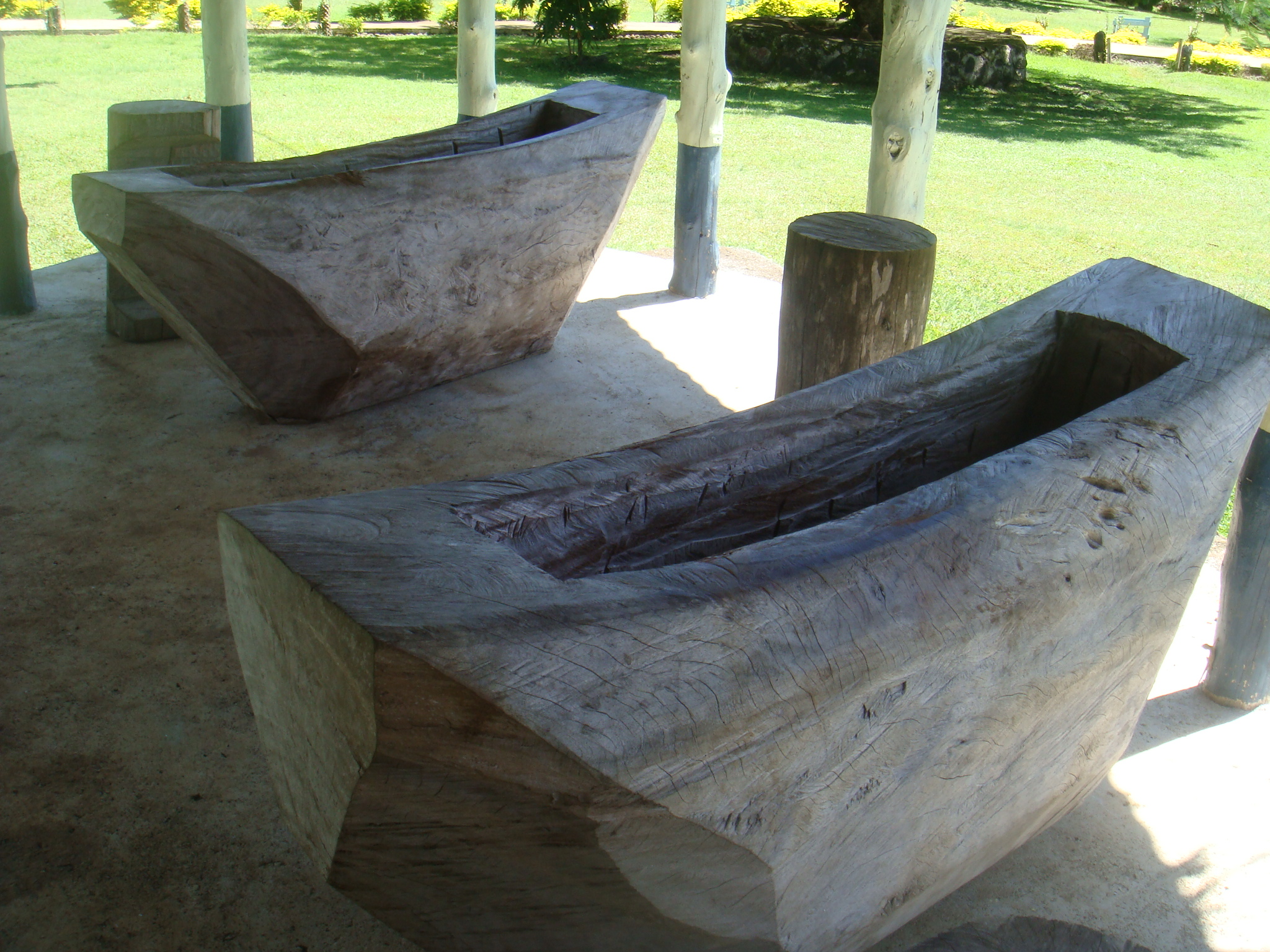
Samoan Talipalau log drums at Piula Theological College, distant ancestor of the Fijian Lali drums

The music of Samoa is a complex mix of cultures and traditions, with pre- and post-European contact histories. Since American colonization, popular traditions such as rap and hip-hop have been integrated into Samoan music.

Traditional Samoan musical instruments include several different distinctive instruments, including a fala, which is a rolled-up mat beaten with sticks and several types of slit drum.

== Instruments ==
Traditional Samoan musical instruments included a fala, which is a rolled-up mat beaten with sticks. It is an idiophone which often accompanied choral singing. Another idiophone, a soundingboard, sometimes accompanied the solo recitation of poetry. A conch shell was blown for signaling. Amusement for small groups and individuals in private was afforded by a jaw harp, a raft panpipe, and a nose-blown flute.

Samoan wooden slit drums and variants have been used throughout Samoa for over a thousand years. There are many uses for these wooden drums, including calling village meetings, in times of war and peace, songs/chants and dance, and signalling long distances in inter-island naval warfare. In recent times they are used predominantly for calling chiefly and royal ceremonies as well as contemporary religious practices.

The five Samoan slit drum variants from largest to smallest are:

1) Logo - felled trees - largest of the drums - The logo can only be played by being struck from the side, for instance by sliding the beater or very large log-like playing stick across the top of the drums to hit the slit lip on the other side. The logo was used to announce the king of Samoa, high chiefs and monarchy in times of old. The logo was also used to announce attacks and signals during times of war see re: Samoan Civil War, the Fijian Wars and also the Tongan Wars. Samoa also has recorded historical records of lesser known battles with neighbouring islands of Manono, Pukapuka, Tokelau, Tuamotu and Rarotonga; these battles may be classed as independent isolated skirmishes and inter-Island skirmishes between large familial klan groups.

2) 2 x Lali - large drum - The Lali are always played in pairs by two drummers. One of them beats the larger of the two; this is called the Tatasi, the other drummer plays the smaller Lali in the rhythmic pattern called the Talua. Both slit drums are played with sticks called Auta. The Lali were said to be introduced from Fiji via Tonga before European discovery..

3) Talipalau . The Talipalau skin drum was introduced to Samoa from east Polynesia in the 1800s, possibly as a result of early missionary society activities in both regions.

4) Pate - this hand-held slit drum was introduced from Tahiti in the 1800s, probably by British missionaries or their Tahitian converts.

5) Nafa - smaller slit drum also made from Milo wood. Now obsolete, only the name remains in proverbial expressions.

"Amerika Samoa", a song with words by Mariota Tiumalu Tuiasosopo and music by Napoleon Andrew Tuiteleleapaga, has been the official territorial anthem of American Samoa since 1950. "The Banner of Freedom," a song that honors the flag of Samoa, has been the national anthem of Samoa since 1962; it was composed by Sauni Iiga Kuresa.

== Post-European contact ==
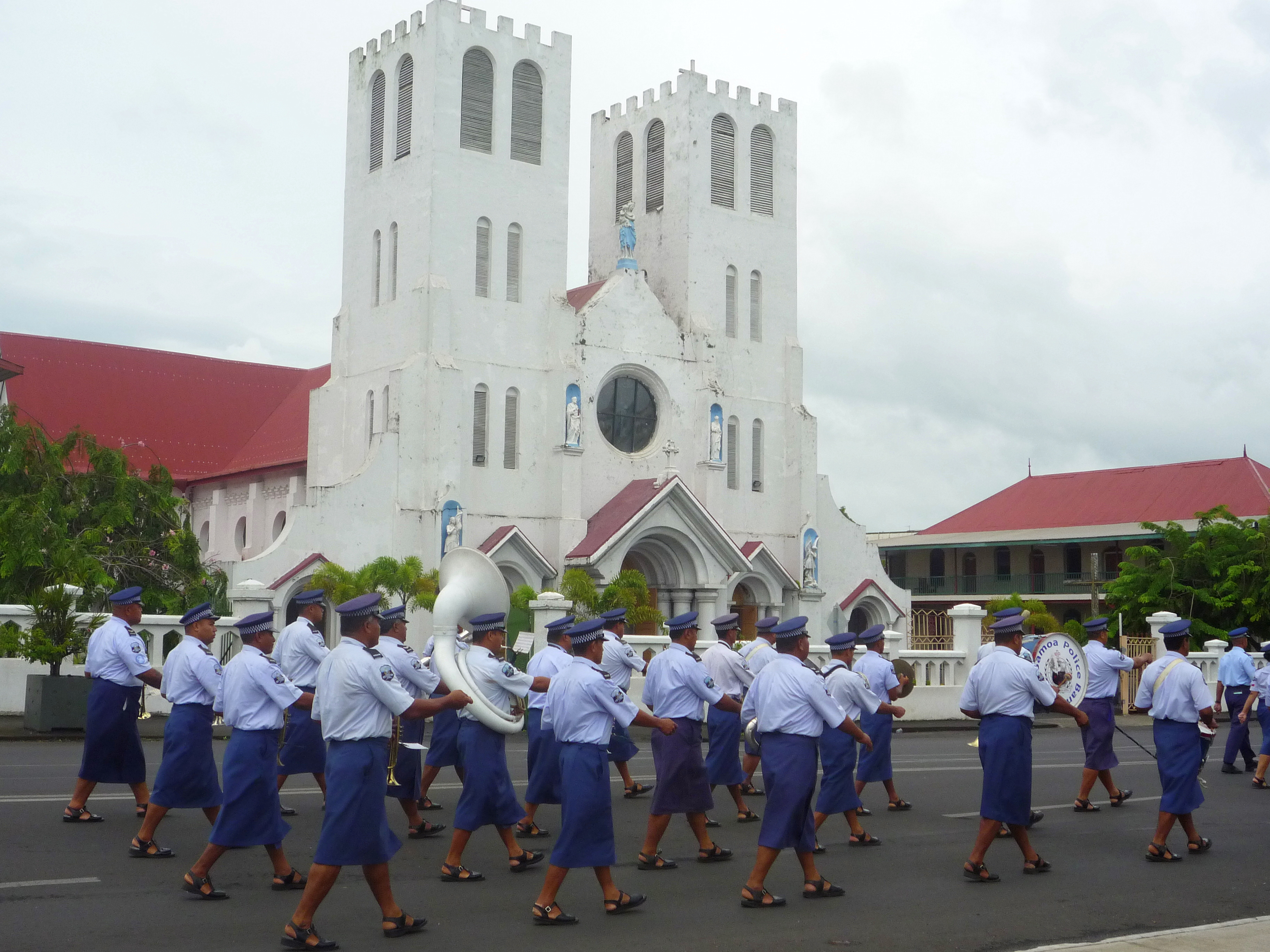
Samoa police brass band marching in Apia to flag raising ceremony. The band marches every morning Mondays - Fridays in Samoa.

With the introduction of Christianity, especially after the arrival of LMS missionaries in 1830, the music of Samoa was greatly influenced by Western evangelical hymnody and popular music, particularly North American popular music. Two stringed instruments quickly became commonplace in the islands: the guitar (kitara) and in the early 20th century the 'ukulele. By the end of the 19th century, European-style brass bands had come into existence in the major towns.

As the islands were Christianized late in the 19th century, ancient songs, accompanied by the percussive sound of sticks beating on a rolled mat, gave way to church choirs singing to the harmonies of pedaled organs. Later, radio transmissions brought more variety, as local artists and audiences embraced each wave of "new" music. The arrival of U.S. Marine Corps during World War II helped solidify the affinity for American popular music. Many earlier bands copied or imitated this music—a trend that continues. It is common practice and well accepted for Samoan music makers to take a Western song, replace the lyrics with Samoan words, and reintroduce the tune as an original. The guitar and 'ukulele became the usual instruments for composing and performing music. That sound is now often replaced by the electronic keyboard and the multiplex of sounds and faux instruments available with it. Many current Samoan musicians "upgrade" old Samoan tunes with new technology, or imitate and copy American popular music.

== Modern music ==
Modern pop and rock have a large audience in Samoa, as do several indigenous bands, which have abandoned most elements of Samoan traditional music, though there are folksy performers. Some pop musicians in New Zealand learned new dance styles on a trip to the islands of Samoa, an important early node in transmitting and translating U.S street dance to Aotearoa. Recently, the Samoan population has seen a resurgence of old Samoan songs, remixed in the style of Hawaiian reggae, but with some traditional elements, such as the use of the pate and the chord structure still in use. New Zealand continues to produce modern popular Samoan stars, such as Jamoa Jam and Pacific Soul. Even traditional hymns (pese lotu) have seen a fair amount of change. Some pop bands, such as the RSA Band and the Mount Vaea Band, are associated with hotels; some hotel bands have toured in New Zealand and elsewhere. Pop musicians include the Lole, Golden Ali'is, The Five Stars, and Jerome Gray, whose "We Are Samoa" remains an unofficial national anthem. A Samoan group called Le Pasefika, going against the current trend by playing only old music, has become the hottest-selling Samoan group in the United States.

The nearly three decades of Samoan involvement in street dance and rap music in the United States has significantly affected cultural production in places where Samoans settled, particularly New Zealand. In the early 1980s, Footsoulijah, four Samoan performers from Wellington, credit the Blue City Strutters, who later became the hip-hop group Boo-Yah T.R.I.B.E, for spreading their lifelong interest in street dance and their eventual gravitation towards hip-hop. Footsoulijah is animated and colorful, and always perform in camouflage fatigues, which represent their militaristic name. The group composed the anthem "Represent for My People," which includes the chorus "Always represent for my peoples / Pacific islanders of foreign soil / style lethal / take a look as we enter the next chapter / flip the script / Polynesian is my flavour."

There is currently a dichotomy between old and new in cultural aspects of Samoan life, especially dance. Some assert, "Whereas Samoan music has adopted guitars and other musical instruments, dance, which relies solely upon the performers body (with some exceptions—fire dance, knife dance, etc) still requires the performer to retain grace and move their arms and hands in the approved fashion" but a National Geographic article from 1985 shows a "juxtaposition of 'tradition' and 'modernity' with two markedly different photographs of Samoan youth." One photograph has a Samoan child in traditional garb, dancing in a traditional way; the other shows a youth dressed in typical hip-hop-style dancing.

Like other Samoans, Kosmo, one of the most famous Samoan hip-hop artists, picked up his dance moves while living in California. He integrated a combination of a bit of strutting, a little boogaloo and popping, and some tutting into his music. He learned the dance while staying with family in Carson, a community that drew large numbers of Samoans relocating from the islands in the 1950s-1970s. As he discovered, popping and other 'street dance' forms thoroughly saturated the lives of Samoan youth growing up in the late 1970s and early 1980s in Carson and neighboring Compton and Long Beach. He vividly remembers, "all the coolest cats was poppin' down at [Carson's] Scott Park." When he returned to New Zealand, his vocabulary brought him prestige among his peers, most of whom tried to integrate dance moves from movies. "Kosmo didn’t consider himself any good until he returned to New Zealand. . . . Here they were just doing the basics, he knew more." For young artists, this hip-hop-oriented form of dancing was not only a way to express oneself creatively, but also a powerful sexual tool: “For young men, dance skills also helped to attract the young women who were always present either as critical audience or fellow dancers. As Kosmo recalls, “All the poppers got the girls,” highlighting another case of dance as an equalizing sexual power tool utilized by both sexes in global hip hop. In 1990, Kosmo and two fellow Samoans created The Mau, a hip-hop group named for the organization that pushed for Samoan independence under the German and New Zealand colonial administrations. Although the name was rooted in Samoan history, it demonstrates U.S. influences. Similar to the movement of black consciousness in America, the motto for the Mau movement in Samoa was Samoa Mo Samoa 'Samoa for Samoans'. The group continued to articulate a diasporic Samoan cultural nationalism by drawing upon their knowledge of Samoan history, as well as the popular stories of the Black Power movement presently circulating in American hip-hop. Their combination of Samoan heritage and American iconography influenced many groups that followed.

Samoans abroad have achieved some musical renown. The Boo-Yaa TRIBE had a brief flirtation with the American mainstream, and the Samoan Sisters found more lasting fame in New Zealand. The shows My Idol and Samoa Star Search became important musical competitions in Samoa. Modern Samoan music shows influence from electronic instruments, jazz, and reggae, and even some house and techno styles.

== International ==
Samoa has produced well-known artists. The band Past To Present / Ilanda (1990–2006) (which consisted of three Samoans and one Māori: Frank Laga'aia, Lennie Keller, Norman Keller & Leighton Hema; Hema later left the band) gained popularity and commercial success in Samoa, New Zealand, Australia, and the United States; its achievement has not yet been equaled by any other islander band. In 2006, it was still in the music industry, touring, recording, or producing, as in its last production of Australia's "Young Divas." A band with a similar career path and success was Kulcha, based in Sydney, which produced two albums but disbanded after a couple of years.

The Katinas, whose parents are Assembly of God Pastors, moved to the United States at one point, are another popular Samoan Gospel band and are active members of the Assembly of God Church. It performed at the Junior Youth Christian Program in Melbourne, Australia, in 2005.

== Bibliography ==
- Kolinsky, Mieczyslaw. 1930. Die Musik der Primitivstämme auf Malaka und ihre Bezeihungen zur samoanischen Musik. Neue Folge 9, Abteilung Südsee IV. Berlin: Museum für Völkerkunde.
- Linkels, Ad, and Lucia Linkels. 1984. Van Schelphoorn tot Disco: Een speurtocht naar muziek en dans in West-Samoa. Karwijk aan Zee: Servire Karwijk.
- Love, Jacob Wainwright. 1991. Samoan Variations: Essays on the Nature of Traditional Oral Arts. New York and London: Garland Publishing. ISBN 0-8240-2985-2.
- Moyle, Richard. 1988. Traditional Samoan Music. Auckland, New Zealand: Auckland University Press. ISBN 1-86940-027-5.
- Turner, George. 1884. Samoa a Hundred Years Ago and Long Before. London: Macmillan.
- Williams, Vernon W. 1974. "Folk Ballads of Samoa and Culture Change." Cultures 1:95–116.
