= Leilua =

Leilua is the surname of the following people

- Bianca Leilua, competitive sailor from Samoa
- Joseph Leilua (born 1991), Australian rugby league footballer
- Luciano Leilua (born 1996), Australian rugby league footballer, brother of Joseph
- Uiliami Leilua Vi (1925–1986), Tongan noble
