= ʻAparima =

Dance from Tahiti and the Cook Islands

The ʻaparima or kaparima (Rarotongan) is a dance from Tahiti and the Cook Islands where the mimics (ʻapa) with the hands (rima) are central, and as such it is close to the hula or Tongan tauʻolunga. It is usually a dance for groups. There are two types of ʻaparima: the ʻaparima hīmene (sung handdance) and the ʻaparima vāvā (silent handdance), the latter being performed with music only, and no singing. The music is often played on the guitar or the Tahitian ʻukulele.

The stories depicted by the dance are taken from daily traditional occupations or ancient myths.

Unlike the other Tahitian dances, this one is more often performed with the dancers dressed in pāreu and maro. It can also (especially the ʻaparima vāvā) be performed seated, much like the Tongan māʻuluʻulu.
