= Tauʻolunga =

Traditional Tongan dance

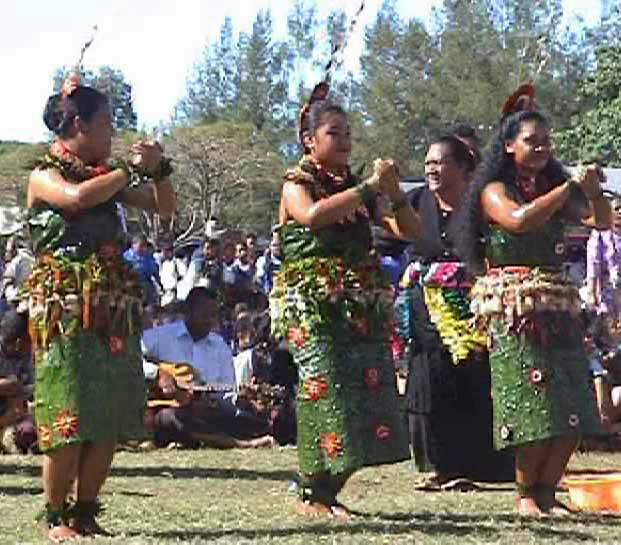
A group tauʻolunga

The tauʻolunga is a traditional Tongan dance. It is a combination of the Samoan Taualuga and the Tongan ula. The type of dance is comparable with (some) Hawaiʻian hula or the Tahitian ʻaparima.

== Performance ==
The tau'olunga is a dance for single young women, especially for them to show off on their wedding day. It is rare--but not impossible--for a married couple or an older woman to do a tau'olunga. It is also rare to see a man perform the dance, but he can mimic the dancing girl's movements in an exaggerated manner to make her beauty more striking by comparison.

The tau'olunga can be danced at any special occasion. Often it is performed by a small group of girls, up to 10 or so, but can also be performed individually. The assistance of older women is usually limited to only handclaps on the rhythm of the music. This role is called the tuʻulafale.

It is usual for a girl to start the dance, then parents, cousins, family members or friends come on the stage to put money notes on her oiled skin, and then join her in the tuʻulafale. The prizemoney (fakapale) is a reward for the girl, unless the dance is performed as part of a fundraising or for a special occasion. It is common for the money to go towards the person being celebrated.

The tauʻolunga mainly consists of a series of hand movements, which interpret the meaning of the selected song. However, most of the movements are so stylised that only experienced practitioners will understand their meaning. Many of the typical gestures (haka) are standardised and have their own name. The movement of the head also plays a significant role: the head and eyes should follow the hands on important movements, otherwise they are to be directed to the public. The eyes are never to glance away from the viewers. From time to time, little nods within one beat (teki) or two beats (kalo) must be made with the head. The girl must smile throughout her performance.

The movements of the body and the legs are less important. They have to follow hands and head. Shaking the hips, as elsewhere in Polynesia, is forbidden. Most of the time the legs are standing still, knees must be together and bent (taulalo). Some small steps--never large--or a turn around can be performed. Overall, the girl's movements should be graceful and soft, as should be her whole body.

A unique feature of any Tongan dance, not found elsewhere in Polynesia, is the rotational movements of the hands and wrists in many of the haka.

== Dress ==
A tauʻolunga girl is usually dressed in a wrap around dress, either made from ngatu with traditional designs; a mat (kie) from handwoven pandanus leaves; a piece of cloth covered with green leaves, grass, fragrant flowers or shells; any shiny piece of cloth, decorated with sewn-on traditional patterns; or even a grass skirt. Every type of costume (teunga) has its own proper name. The dress reaches from just above the breasts down to the knees (or sometimes past the knee), leaving her arms and legs bare. As long skirts are the traditional apparel for Tongan girls, this is an occasion to show off her legs. If they are fair, the better.

Putting oil on her exposed skin parts so that they shine enhances her beauty even more in the Tongan mind. Around her middle she wears a belt (kafa) also usually made from leaves and fragrant flowers. Wristlets and anklets (vesa) may be worn, ranging from simple bands of cloth or ngatu to elaborate belts of leaves and flowers again. Around her neck she wears a black ribbon with a white cowry shell on it or not (puleʻoto). On her head she wears a little crown (tekiteki), which will enhance her head movements during the dance, consisting of feathers or some light plant material.

Natural materials are preferred for both dancer's outfits, however modern outfits are sometimes made out of plastic.

== History ==
Many technical motifs of the tauʻolunga are derived from the ancient Tongan ula / faʻahi-ula / fahaʻiula. The original ula was a group dance of young chiefly daughters who, on the rhythm of a quite monotonous song, made a series of postures beautiful to look at. The formalization of the dance as a distinct genre followed the introduction of the Samoan "taualuga" during the early 19th century and its institution among Tongan aristocratic circles (especially those associated with the Tu'i Kanokupolu lineages). The postures originally emphasized finger and hand motifs (following Samoan stylistics), until 1950 when queen Sālote personally integrated the distinctly Tongan wrist flourishes and lakalaka leg transitions into her song "Manu ʻo Palataisi" (Bird of Paradise), leading to the technical composition and format of the contemporary Tongan tauʻolunga.
