= Himene =

Oe Himene are formal choral Tahitian songs, often of religious nature. Himene is a Tahitian term derived from the English word hymn.

Since the first European contact by Captain Samuel Wallis, English Protestantism was expanded to the island by missionaries. Himene are based in verse and harmonic structure on Protestant hymns.

'Words have never succeeded in conveying the impression made by this music. Some have said that it was like an ocean wave coming in with growing strength as the voices increased in intensity, breaking and rolling and bounding and then the dying down and disappearing in a long, sustained note. The women's voices carried the melody while the men provided a deep, rhythmic counterpoint, one of them with a great voice sometimes throwing out cries and appeals. All the people rocked back and forth as they sang, many with their eyes shut, entirely lost in the music.' (Quoting Lebeau, 1911.)

Himene performances take place during festivities as well as a major competition on Bastille Day.

A more raucous set of songs is called himene tarava.

== See also ==
- Imene tuki and imene metua of Rarotonga, Cook Islands.
