= Wolf Call (film) =

1939 adventure film

- Directed by: George Waggner
- Written by: Jack London (novel); George Waggner
- Produced by: Paul Malvern
- Starring: John Carroll; Movita; George Lynn
- Cinematography: Fred Jackman Jr.
- Edited by: Carl Pierson
- Music by: Edward J. Kay
- Production company: Monogram Pictures
- Distributed by: Monogram Pictures
- Release date: May 22, 1939
- Running time: 62 minutes
- Country: United States
- Language: English

Wolf Call is a 1939 American Western film directed by George Waggner and starring John Carroll, Movita and George Lynn. A New York playboy is sent by his father to investigate his radium mine in Canada.

== Cast ==
- John Carroll as Michael 'Mike' Vance
- Movita as Towana
- George Lynn as Father Devlin
- Guy Usher as Michael Vance, Sr.
- Holmes Herbert as J.L. Winton
- Polly Ann Young as Natalie
- George Cleveland as Dr. MacTavish
- John Kelly as Bull Nelson
- Wheeler Oakman as Carson
- John Sheehan as Grogan
- Charles Irwin as Mounted Police Sergeant
- Reed Howes as Tom - Henchman
- Murdock MacQuarrie as Miner
- Carl Mathews as Miner
- George Morrell as Stricken Miner
- Pat O'Malley as RCMP Sergeant
- Tex Phelps as Miner
- Roger Williams as Tom Blake

== Bibliography ==
- Pitts, Michael R. Western Movies: A Guide to 5,105 Feature Films. McFarland, 2012.
