= Movita Castaneda =

American actress (1916–2015)

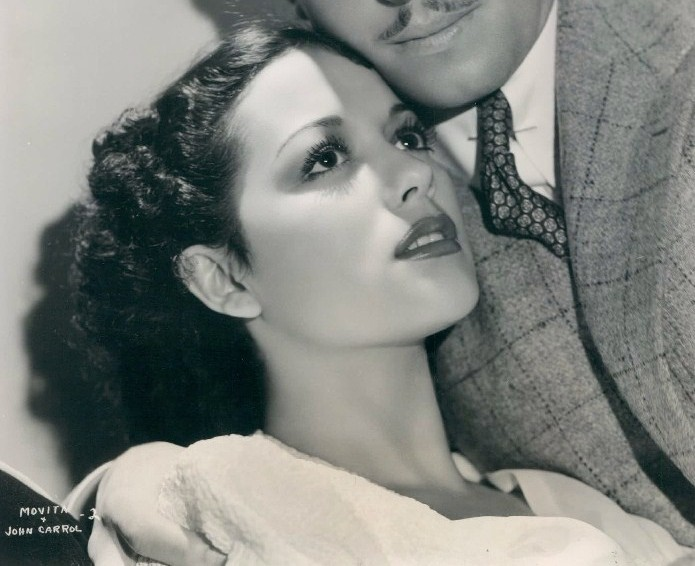
- Castaneda in Wolf Call (1939)
- Born: Maria Luisa Castaneda; April 12, 1916; Nogales, Arizona, U.S.
- Died: February 12, 2015 (aged 98); Los Angeles, California, U.S.
- Occupation: Actress
- Years active: 1930–1989
- Spouses: Jack Doyle (m. 1939; div. 1944) Marlon Brando (m. 1960; ann. 1968)
- Children: 2

Maria Luisa "Movita" Castaneda (April 12, 1916 – February 12, 2015) was an American actress and the second wife of actor Marlon Brando. In films, she played exotic women and singers, such as in Flying Down to Rio (1933) and Mutiny on the Bounty (1935). She was the mother of Miko Castaneda Brando and Rebecca Brando Kotlizky.

== Life and work ==
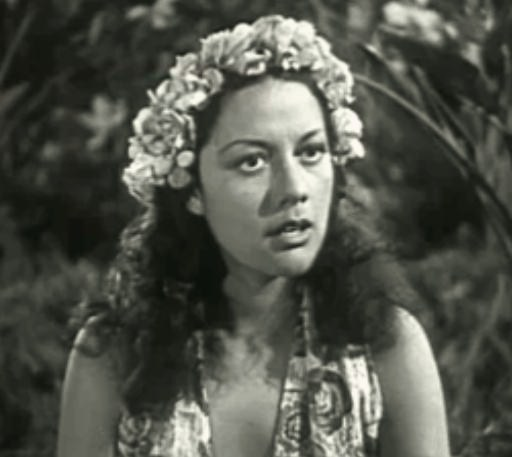
Castaneda in Paradise Isle (1937)

Movita, an American of Mexican descent, was born in Nogales, Arizona, on a train traveling between Mexico and Arizona. Movita began her acting career singing the Carioca to Ginger Rogers and Fred Astaire's first dance number in the first film in which the famous duo appeared together, Flying Down to Rio (1933). She continued playing exotic women in American and Spanish language films in the 1930s, most notably as a Tahitian girl, Tehanni in Mutiny on the Bounty (1935) alongside Clark Gable and Franchot Tone. She played an island girl in Paradise Isle (1937) and again in Girl from Rio (1939) with Warren Hull. She starred in the British thriller Tower of Terror (1941) alongside Wilfrid Lawson and Michael Rennie. After a break, she appeared as Henry Fonda's cook in Fort Apache (1948), then starred with Tim Holt in two further westerns: The Mysterious Desperado (1949) and Saddle Legion (1951).

In 1939, Movita married the Irish boxer, singer and actor Jack Doyle in Mexico. The marriage did not endure. After appearing in a few more minor westerns and a few television parts, she met the actor Marlon Brando in the late 1950s, after his breakup with Anna Kashfi. They married in 1960, and they had two children. Brando played the role of Fletcher Christian in the 1962 remake of the 1935 film in which Movita had played a Tahitian girl, Tehanni. Brando then married his co-star Tarita Teriipaia in 1962. Castaneda's marriage to Brando was annulled in 1968 after it was discovered she was still legally married to Doyle. After a small role on television in 1977, Movita appeared as Ana in 17 episodes of Knots Landing from October 1987 to May 1989.

== Death ==
Castaneda died at age 98 on February 12, 2015, in Los Angeles, after being hospitalized for a neck injury.

== Filmography ==
Year	Title	Role	Notes
1930	El Dios del mar		
1933	Flying Down to Rio	Carioca Singer	Uncredited
1934	La buenaventura		
1934	The Scandal	Gregoria	
1934	Tres Amores	Doris	
1935	Señora casada necesita marido	Doncella	
1935	The Tia Juana Kid	Cabaret Dancer	
1935	Mutiny on the Bounty	Tehani	
1935	El diablo del Mar	Maya	
1936	Captain Calamity	Annana	
1936	El capitan Tormenta	Anyana	
1937	Paradise Isle	Ila	
1937	The Hurricane	Arai	
1938	Rose of the Rio Grande	Rosita del Torre	
1939	Wolf Call	Towana	
1939	Girl from Rio	Marquita Romero	
1941	Tower of Terror	Marie Durand	
1948	Fort Apache	Guadalupe	
1949	The Mysterious Desperado	Luisa	
1949	Red Light	Trina	Uncredited
1950	Wagon Master	Young Navajo Indian	
1950	Federal Man	Lolita Martinez / Montez	
1950	The Furies	Chiquita	
1950	A Lady Without Passport	Lorena	Uncredited
1950	The Petty Girl	Carmelita Moray	Uncredited
1950	Kim	Woman with Baby	Uncredited
1951	Soldiers Three	Cabaret woman	
1951	Saddle Legion	Mercedes	
1952	Wild Horse Ambush	Lita Espinosa	
1953	Dream Wife	Rima	
1953	Ride, Vaquero!	Hussy	Uncredited
1955	Apache Ambush	Rosita	
