= Paradise Isle =

1937 film by Arthur Greville Collins

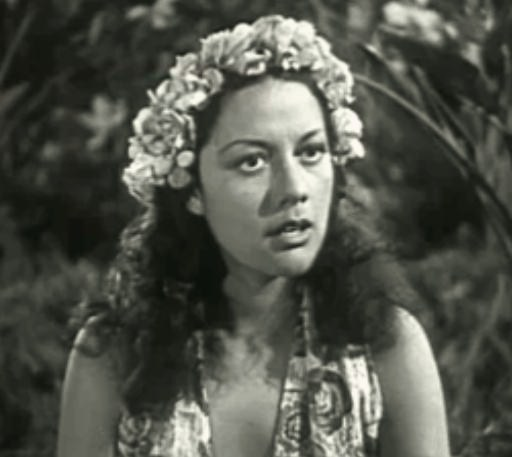
- Movita in film
- Directed by: Arthur Greville Collins
- Written by: Allan Vaughan Elston (story "The Belled Palm"); Marion Orth (adaptation and screenplay)
- Produced by: Dorothy Davenport
- Starring: See below
- Cinematography: Gilbert Warrenton
- Edited by: Russell F. Schoengarth
- Music by: Sam Koki; Napoleon Andrew Tuiteleleapaga
- Distributed by: Monogram Pictures
- Release date: July 21, 1937
- Running time: 73 minutes
- Country: United States
- Language: English

Paradise Isle is a 1937 American film directed by Arthur Greville Collins with sequences shot in American Samoa. The film was produced by Dorothy Davenport under the name "Dorothy Reid" and was released by Monogram Pictures. The film stars Mexican actress Movita Castaneda continuing her persona of a South Seas Island girl that began with Mutiny on the Bounty (1935).

== Plot summary ==
Kennedy is a shipwrecked blind artist who is washed ashore on an island en route to meeting an eminent eye surgeon in Suva who is the only chance to restore his sight. He is nursed back to health by Ida, an island girl. When Kennedy is distraught that he cannot pay for the operation due to his money being lost when his ship went down, Ida obtains a valuable black pearl that sets scheming in motion on the island paradise.

== Cast ==
- Movita Castaneda as Ida
- Warren Hull as Kennedy
- William B. Davidson as Hoener
- John St. Polis as Coxon
- George Piltz as Tono (as George Pilita)
- Pierre Watkin as Steinmeyer
- Kenneth Harlan as Johnson
- Russell Simpson as Baxter

== Crew ==
- Dorothy Davenport (Associate Producer)
- Sam Koki (Original Music)
- Gilbert Warrenton (Cinematographer)
- Russell F. Schoengarth (Film Editor)
- Scott R. Dunlap (Production Manager)
- Harry Knight (Assistant Director)
- William A. Wilmarth (Sound Recordist)
- Fred Jackman (Special Effects)
- E.R. Hickson (Technical Director)

== Soundtrack ==
- Warren Hull - "Paradise Isle" (written by Lani McIntyre and Napo Tuiteleleapaga)
- "Hawaiian Chant" (written by Lani McIntyre and Napo Tuiteleleapaga)

== Critical reception ==
The Film Daily gave a positive review that praised the direction of Arthur Greville Collins and the performances of Movita and Warren Hull, and described the film as a "pleasant little story" that was "finely photographed."

Motion Picture Daily described the film as "a charming and pleasant love story" and commented, "The entire production is a creditable one, albeit it does not feature any deep motivation."
