= Mere Tuiasosopo Betham =

American Samoan educator, civil servant and government minister

Director of the Department of Education, American Samoa
- In office 1978–1988?
- Governor: Peter Tali Coleman

Associate Judge of High Court of American Samoa
- In office 1991–?

Personal details
- Born: Mere Tuiasosopo; 3 April 1932 Tafuna, Tutuila, America Samoa
- Died: 13 June 1997 (aged 65)
- Spouse: James Manuel Betham
- Children: Six
- Education: Geneva College

Mere Tuiasosopo Betham (1932–1997) was the first woman to be appointed as the Director of Education in American Samoa and also the first female associate judge of the High Court of American Samoa.

== Early life ==
Mere Tuiasosopo Betham was born on 3 April 1932 at Tafuna on Tutuila island, the main island of American Samoa. Her father was Mariota Tiumalu Tuiasosopo, a High Talking Chief of American Samoa. Her mother was Venise Patini Pulefa'asisina. She had two brothers and a sister. She began primary school below the legal age and recalled that her teachers would hide her when school inspectors visited. She joined the High School of American Samoa, the territory's first high school, in 1946, its first year of operation, and graduated as the only female out of 16 students in the first graduating class of 1950. Her father was a strong believer in the opportunities presented by colonization of American Samoa by the USA and encouraged his daughter to study in America. After a year at Pomona College in Claremont, California, she transferred to Geneva College in Beaver Falls, Pennsylvania, where she graduated in January, 1954, with a Bachelor of Arts degree in economics and a minor in secondary education. She was certified as a teacher in Pennsylvania, being the first woman from Samoa to receive teaching qualifications from the USA. Returning home after three and a half years away, Betham found it difficult to adjust to Samoan society. In 1955, she married an American, James Manuel Betham, and they had six children.

== Career ==
Betham became one of the first Samoan teachers in the American Samoan educational system. Over four decades she held progressively important positions, first as a classroom teacher, then as a vice principal and a principal, before being appointed assistant director of the Department of Education, at a time when few Samoans held administrative positions in government. In late 1977, Peter Tali Coleman became American Samoa's first popularly elected Governor, and in 1978 Betham was appointed as the first Samoan female to hold a cabinet office, serving as director of the Education Department, a post she held for more than a decade.

Betham is particularly known for her efforts to develop the capacity of local Samoan teachers and for her development of a bilingual and bicultural education system, which addressed the desire of Samoans to maintain their cultural identity while being educated to be able to meet the demands of the modern world. In partnership with the University of Hawaii, Oregon College of Education, and Brigham Young University she organized undergraduate and graduate degree courses, which combined training in American Samoa and in the USA. With support from Betty Kendall Johnston and Iutita Savali, Betham introduced an Early Childhood Education program designed to familiarize preschool age children with formal education. She also introduced educational television.

== High Court of American Samoa ==
In 1991, Betham was appointed to the all-male high court of American Samoa, which included seven Samoan associate judges. Her knowledge of the Samoan culture was fiercely sought by leaders aiming to both preserve the Samoan heritage and implement an American justice system. In order to become an associate judge, she had to be initiated into her village's council of chiefs, traditionally all-male in most Samoan villages.

== Awards and honours ==
- Educator of the Year Award in American Samoa. Betham was the first recipient.
- Distinguished Service to Education Award, presented by Brigham Young University.

== Death ==
Mere Tuiasosopo Betham died on 13 June 1997.
