= Uiliami Leilua Vi =

Uiliami Leilua Vi known by his Tongan noble title Hon. Lord Veʻehala (1925–1986) was a Tongan noble best known as a nose-flute player. He remains the most famous Tongan musician, both at home and abroad, and his recordings are still traditionally the first broadcast every day by Radio Tonga.

== Background ==
He was born on March 23, 1925, in Nuku’alofa to Hon. Lord Veʻehala (Feleti Vi) and Mele Luʻisa Simoa Vi of Fahefa Estate, Tongatapu. He was educated at Wesley College and Auckland Grammar School in New Zealand. Originally expected to attend the University of Auckland, he was instead selected as a protege by Queen Sālote Tupou III, accompanying her on international visits, and becoming Keeper of the Palace Records. In 1946, after his father's death he was installed upon the noble title of Veʻehala and inherited the Fahefa estate. He was a governor of Ha'apai and Keeper of Public Records from 1948 - 1953, than from 1950 - 1968, he was the Secretary of Traditions Committee in Tonga.

When Elizabeth II of England visisted Tonga in 1953, he was master of ceremonies, responsible for organising the feasts, dancers, and nose-flute players who would wake her in the morning. In 1964 he was one of the commissioners who opened the Tongan Legislative Assembly. In 1967 he was in charge of the formal coronation of king Tāufaʻāhau Tupou IV. He was also known as a broadcaster, hosting the "South Pacific Hour" on Radio Tonga. He spoked many Pacific languages - Tongan, Samoan, Fijian, Niuean, and Rotuman, and would answer correspondents in whchever one they had used.

In 1972 he attended the first South Pacific Festival of the Arts in Fiji, leading a troupe of dancers. In 1976 he talked about Tongan culture and demonstrated the nose-flute at the Sydney Opera House.

== Marriage and issue ==
He married ʻEva-ʻi-pomana ʻUlukalala, natural daughter of Hon. Lord Finau ʻUlukalala VI (Ha'amea). They had two sons and one daughter.

He died of unknown circumstances on November 26, 1986, and his son succeeded him as Hon. Lord Veʻehala.
