= Michelle Rounds =

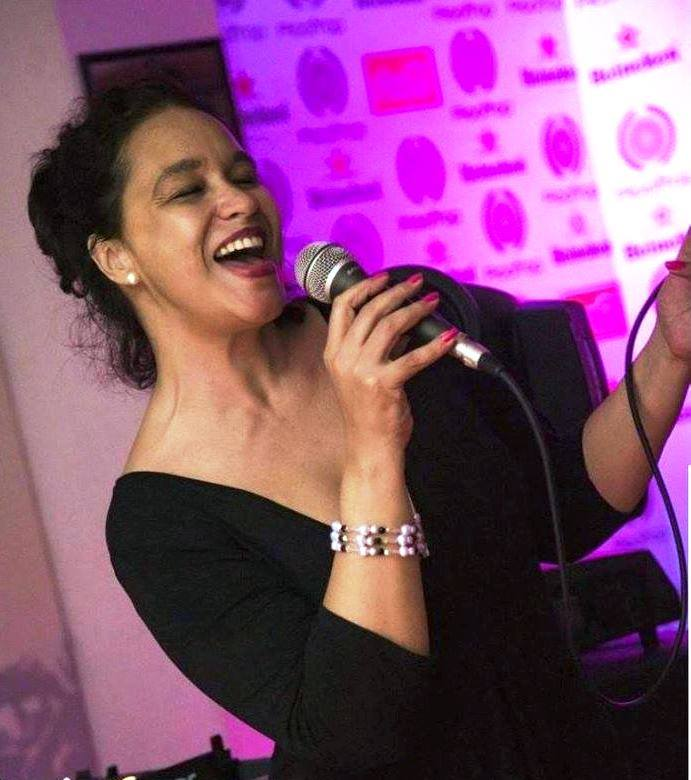

Background information
- Born: 29 April 1962 (age 63); Sydney
- Genres: Jazz; Soul; Funk; Reggae
- Occupation: Singer-songwriter
- Years active: 1990–present
- Labels: Cumquat, Mangrove, PI Inc.
- Website: michellerounds.com

Michelle Rounds (29 April 1962) is a jazz singer, songwriter, and teacher from Australia.

== Early life ==
The eldest daughter of five children, Rounds was born in Sydney, Australia. Her father, John Rounds, was an architect, and 2nd generational composer, musician and singer. Her grandmother Bonita Rounds, was a singer and multi-instrumentalist and created the first all female band in Suva, Fiji in the early 1940s. Her family moved to Fiji when she was 11.

== Career ==
Rounds is a scat singer who has released several albums and is a supporter of using native language and dialect. On Let Me See Now in 2005 she collaborated with the Japanese rap artists Steal & Shorty. In 2014 she released Time & Space, recorded with Egyptian Lil.garhy, who raps in Arabic and at the time of recording was 17 years old. In 1998 she won a Te Reo Award from TVNZ for her version of the Fijian "Era Bini Tu". This award is given to people who use indigenous languages in their music.

She performed extensively in the Australasia region with Tom Mawi.

She has been performing in Cairo, Egypt since 2009 and has performed at the Cairo Opera House, Kempinski Nile Hotel, El Sawy Culturewheel, and is a regular performer at Cairo Jazz Club. In 2014, she began giving vocal training to Egyptian children and adults. Michelle is represented and managed by Sulu Daunivalu her music is available on Spotify

== Awards ==
- Te Reo Award – New Zealand from TVNZ for Keeping It Real (Pacific National Volume 1) (1998)
- Vakalutuivoce Award – Fijian music award from FPRA (FPRA was established under the guidance of APRA) 1996 – Best Album (Draw Blood) and Best Female Artist.

== Discography ==
- Draw Blood (1994)
- Contrasts (1996)
- A Matcha Chocolate Love Adventure (2005)
- Coffee Time Jazz (2005)
- Autumn Leaves (Spectra, 2010)
- Michelle Rounds and Her Amazing Friends (2013)
- Bliss (2021)
- Into the Sky (2021)
- Rhythm of the Evening (2022)
- The Blue Apron (2023)
- Orange (2023)
- The Direction (2024)
- The Rick Robertson Production (2025)
