= Ula (dance) =

The ula (dance) is an ancient Tongan group dance, already reported by early European navigators like Captain Cook. It is also known as fahaʻi-ula (split dance), which may be degenerated to fahaʻiula. Traditionally, it is performed after an ʻotuhaka. It is still danced nowadays, although less popular than its descendant the tauʻolunga. It used to be more popular before the arrival of Christianity and was the main dance, danced by women before the tau'olunga replaced it. The dance used to be fast paced, involved movement in the hips, legs, feet and upper body. However with the arrival of Christianity, the royal family completely altered the dance. Now the movements are more stiff and conservative.

== Lyrics ==
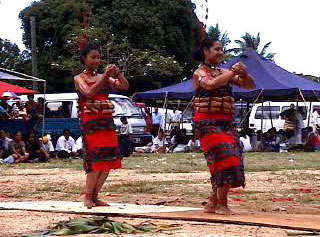
Fū - any dance starts with a cupped hand clap to get started with the rhythm

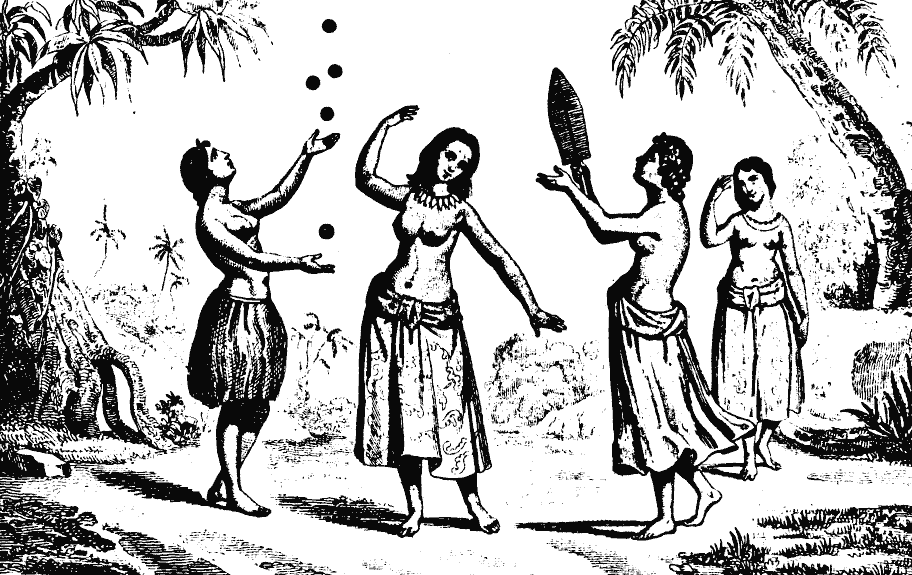
Girls, (perhaps portraited on Malaspina's visit to Vavaʻu in 1793), performing different dances. From left to right: hiko (juggling), ula, meʻetuʻupaki (or a female equivalent), ʻūpē or fisipā (clicking the fingers)

Some older chants:

ʻOiau, siʻa langi ula; ʻi ʻiē
fai mai siʻa tauʻolunga. ʻio!

Tulopa he ʻiau moe; ʻio ē!
vasaleva ʻiau moe; ʻio!

Sina vai tava ʻā ē
he ʻiē, ʻā ē.

Sina vai tafe loʻu lonā.
ʻio, ʻio, he loʻu lonā.

Tunotuna ʻoe Ale-le-sā,
manuia ʻoe saualuma.

Laulau tuʻi Vaea ē,
Vaea lau mānaʻia.

These parts are from the beginning of the 20th century:

Tonga, Tonga ē,
tulituli faiva, he tuli faiva ē
peʻi kau muʻa peʻi kau mai
ke tau kalofi kuo tau e langi
tulituli faiva, he tuli faiva ē.

Tonga, Tonga ē,
tulituli faiva, he tuli faiva ē
ko e faiva ni ko hoto kakala
ʻo lau taʻanga pea fola haka
tulituli faiva, he tuli faiva ē.

Tonga, Tonga ē,
tulituli faiva, he tuli faiva ē
kuo ke meaʻi siʻoto founga
fiemālie tuku ke u ula
tulituli faiva, he tuli faiva ē.

And then there are still more variants.

== Execution ==
The name split dance comes from the habit that the performers split up in two (or more) groups, one entering the stage from the left, the other from the right, until the two meet in the centre and merge into one or more rows. The performers are always girls, it is rare that boys will join.

The dance movements are in essence very simple and limited. Most of the work, making supple, beautiful postures, is done by the hands and the head. The body remains quite stiff, and except for an occasional step or a kneeling, the legs are not much used either.

The dress of the girls is like that of the tauʻolunga, although the red dress is here most popular.
