= Napoleon Andrew Tuiteleleapaga =

American Samoan public figure (1904–1988)

Napoleon A. Tuiteleleapaga (II)
- Born: Napoleon Ross; May 25, 1904; American Samoa
- Died: December 25, 1988 (aged 84); Leone, American Samoa
- Resting place: Leone, American Samoa
- Education: Loyola Law School, LL.B.
- Occupations: Composer; lawyer; government liaison
- Notable work: Amerika Samoa
- Title: Fofogaoali'i, Tuitelelapaga
- Spouses: Pousilaoleualesiameleke Pesa (divorced); Thelma King
- Children: 4

Napoleon A. Tuiteleleapaga (II) (May 25, 1904 – December 25, 1988) was a prominent figure of both Western and American Samoa. He was a lawyer, author, amateur poet and musician from Leone, Tutuila, American Samoa. He is best known for composing the American Samoan anthem, "Amerika Samoa".

== Early life ==
Napoleon was born on May 25, 1904. He hails from the island of Tutuila in American Samoa. Like many Samoans of his time, Tuiteleleapaga grew up in poverty. He was a self-taught man. He loved to learn and stay relevant with societal changes. He graduated from the Marist Brothers School located in, Leone Village, Alataua County, Western District, Tutuila, American Samoa. After his commencement, Tuiteleleapaga continued his independent studies. Tuiteleleapaga sought to quench his thirst for knowledge until his final days. Tuiteleleapaga was very keen with all types of music and fancied brass instruments the most. Napoleon had the innate ability to be able to pick up an instrument and begin to play it. People close to Napoleon tell stories of how he would compose songs on restaurant napkins. Years later, Napoleon earned a LL. B. from Loyola Law School in Los Angeles, California.

== Career and occupations ==
Napoleon has many occupations. He served as a school teacher, secretary, stenographer, statistician, reporter, editor of the only government paper, the "O Le Fa'atonu," research officer for the legislature of American Samoa, translator, interpreter, Chairman of the American Historical Commission, Investigation Officer for the High court of American Samoa, and head of the magistrates and village courts. His Government work had taken him to nearly all the 50 states of the union, as well as, Puerto Rico, the Virgin Islands, Tonga, Fiji, and New Zealand. These trips allowed him to meet kings, queens, prime ministers, and other dignitaries.

== U.S. and American Samoa Government career ==
Napoleon was employed by the U.S. Navy. While employed by U.S. Navy, he received clearance from the Navy Department in Washington to assist Lt. Cdr. Allan M. MacQuarrie, aide-de-camp to the last naval governor, Capt. Thomas F. Darden, to handle all the confidential and top-secret documents in closing the administration of the Navy and its transfer to the Department of the Interior.

=== President Lyndon B. Johnson ===
In 1966, U.S. President Lyndon B. Johnson visited the island of American Samoa. Napoleon was very instrumental for the presidential visit. Napoleon was asked by the Governor of American Samoan and Members of the President's cabinet to write the welcome speech and conduct the ceremonies.

== Music career ==
Napoleon was a renowned Samoan composer. He wrote the national anthem of American Samoa, several popular songs and music for Hollywood feature films that were set in the Pacific islands. He donated the rights to his songs to the nation of American Samoa.

=== "Amerika Samoa!" ===
His greatest accomplishment was the composition of the music for the national anthem of American Samoa. He wrote the anthem in his late 20s then went on to compose other songs. The territorial anthem was officially adopted in 1950.

=== "Let me hear you whisper"/Tele I'a Ole Sami ===
In the early part of his life he composed with Ray Evans and Jay Livingston, the song, "Tele Ia Ole Sami" which translates to 'there are many fish in the sea'. The song is mostly known by its English title, "Let me Hear you Whisper". This song has been recorded by many Samoan recording artists including groups such as the Samoan Surf Riders, and Fatu.

=== Paradise Isle ===
Tuiteleleapaga composed two songs for Paradise Isle, "Paradise Isle" and "Hawaiian Chant", and he played a role in the naming of "Samoa" and "Talofa" streets in Hollywood, CA.

=== Australian Broadcasting Corporation ===
ABC Radio National referred to him as "...the eminent Samoan chief and scholar Napoleone Tuiteleleapaga" and quoted his writings regarding the derivation of the Western Polynesian word 'Papalagi' meaning "white people". As a clan chief, he played a role in improving relations between islanders and outsiders.

=== Other notable works ===
- Ua Mamalu Tele a.k.a. O Le Vi'i a Leone
- Minoi Minoi
- Good Bye My Friend – "Tofa mai Feleni"
- Talofa ...Sio Matou Alofa
- Sau ia se'I e maimoa
- Falagiga o le Nu'u ole Leone
- Se'I Tulouna Pule Ono ma Tumua
- O le Aso Pasikate
- Leone…o lo'u Nu'u e
- Pese o Moseniolo Eseese
- Vi'I o le Fale Laumei, Falema'I I Fagaalu – LBJ Tropical Medical Center
- Lagaali o Maugasa
- Figota o le Sami – Pone segasega tuu'u

== Legal career ==
In his third year at Loyola, Napoleon was given permission by both the school administration and the State of California to represent Samoans that required legal representation in the state. He defended three young Samoan men, who were charged with kidnap and rape in San Francisco, and was able to convince the court to vindicate the three young men. The San Francisco chronicle wrote an article about the case and referred to Napoleon as "The Samoan attorney from Los Angeles with a hula skirt."

Three months later, a law firm in Santa Ana, California, asked Napoleon to aid in the defense of a Samoan woman who was charged with the murder of her newly-born grandchild. He was able to convince the court to spare the woman from the death penalty or life imprisonment.

He cherished a letter by one of the firm attorneys who handled the case, Mr. Samuel Taylor, Jr. The letter said " . . . and certainly though your efforts the whole affairs was made much more manageable, and I am sure we could not have gotten the same result without you. Surely, much credit is due to you for everything you did, all the time you sacrificed, and all of this during your most difficult law school period."

After earning his LL.B from Loyola School, Napoleon traveled back and forth between Samoa and the United States to represent Samoans in legal and political matters.

=== Governor A.P. Lutali ===
At one point in Napoleon's life, he and his oldest grandson, Napoleon Jr. worked long and hard to help put A.P. Lutali into the U.S. House of Representatives. Although the seat would go to Fofo Sunia, Lutali didn't abandon his political ambition. Years later, Chief Lutali would once again call on the help of the Tuiteleleapaga family to aid him with his campaign for Governor of American Samoa. Lutali praised the two men as, "Masters of Politics." The Lutali and Tuiteleleapaga families have since remained close friends.

== Writing career ==
Napoleon wrote a book that focused on Samoan culture and all the aspects of daily island lifestyle titled, Samoa: Yesterday, Today, and Tomorrow. The book was published in 1980 with an introduction by the renowned anthropologist Margaret Mead. "The book deals with the history of Samoa as remembered and recorded, with old customs and with hew, seen though the eyes of a leaned contemporary Samoan. It is the first book of its kind written by a full-blooded Samoan, who was born, raised, and educated in the islands. Most books about a people who once depended upon oral tradition and their own distinctive religious system, and later become part of the literate Cristian world, distinguish sharply between the two." -Margaret Mead

The book is a concise telling of Samoan lifestyle with both a historic and anthropological viewpoint. Tuiteleleapaga set out to outline and vividly describe certain events of Samoan culture in which he found to be significant. In the text, Tuiteleleapaga states that his text is not a publication that contains any scientific arguments or dissertations. The book is treasured among the people of both Samoa and American Samoa, especially the village of Leone.

== Personal life and characteristics ==
Napoleon's private life was very colorful. He was very charismatic but was also very rigid. He had a firm belief that God is real and that God was the first cause of everything. Napoleon attributed his successes to God and blamed his failures on nature. He never attended high school. Despite his lack of proper education, Napoleon always found a way to learn. He loved learning and practicing various subjects. Some of those subjects include, music composition, literature, anthropology, legal studies, and foreign languages.

=== Relationships and family ===
Napoleon's parents were Teofilo Ta'afano Iuli and Lusia Tuiteleleapaga. Napoleon was the oldest of eleven children, Leto'a Iereneo Iuli, Pula Nikolao Iuli, Maselino Iuli, Ropati "Papu" Iuli, Lemanu'a Maselino Iuli, Penitito Iuli, Filimino Iuli (Deceased), Aukuso "Gus" Iuli (Deceased), and his only sister, To'asefulu Kolotita To'omata Iuli-Tavale. Napoleon was married to Pousilaoleualesiameleke Pesa, with whom he had his oldest child, Oleaveolelaeosomaiilematasaua Napoleone Tuiteleleapaga. Many years later, Tuiteleleapaga divorced Pesa and married Thelma King.

== Chief/Matai ==
Napoleon was given the title "Fofogaoali'i" in the 1940s. One of the benefactors of said title was High Chief and Senator, Rapi Sotoa. Sotoa honored Napoleon by giving recognition to Napoleon's accomplishments and services to their country. The title "Fofogaoali'i" can be loosely translated to "speaker for the chiefs." Napoleon was very proud and humbled by the chief title, however, he wasn't completely satisfied. Napoleon quipped that he was not very keen of the chief title because there weren't any lands attached to the chief title.

On June 29, 1969, Napoleon was given the family title, "Tuiteleleapaga" after the death of his great great grandfather, Natagiala Tuiteleleapaga. The Tuiteleleapaga title hails from the village of Leone, American Samoa. In the village of Leone, the Tuiteleleapaga title is a tamaali'i title and sits as one of the highest chiefs.

== Religious life ==
Tuiteleleapaga was a devout Roman Catholic. Napoleon served and defended the Catholic Church loyally and faithfully. He represented the Catholic population of American Samoa in the Church Unification Committee of Samoa. He composed many hymns for the Samoan Catholic community and was known to conduct the Leone Catholic Choir. He translated the anthem "Long Live The Pope" into the Samoan Language and composed his own memorial anthem for the first Samoan cardinal, Cardinal Pio Taofinu'u. He invited Pope Paul VI to visit Samoa during the visit of two papal emissaries. In connection with this, the "Tautai" (Fisherman), a local Catholic newspaper, in its publication in Vol. II, No. 11, November 1970, said: ". . . and it was on this occasion that High Chief Tuiteleleapaga Napoleone asked the visitors on behalf of the bishop, priests, nuns, catechists, and Samoan Catholics, to convey to the Holy Father their request that he extend his visit to Samoa." The emissaries, Msgr. E. Macchi and Bishop Marzinkus, replied, "Your wish will be conveyed to the Holy Father; we will keep on reminding him, and you will be notified as to his decision before he starts his visit to Australia."

On the memorable and significant event, Napoleon not only showed his versatility but did something that surprised both the Samoan and white population. It was imperative that three anthems, "Long Live The Pope", "Star Spangled Banner", and "Amerika Samoa" must be played, sung or both. This was most difficult because only three minutes were allowed, due to a very tight schedule, enhanced by the fact that Napoleon had to conduct five different choirs composed of more than 400 singers, accompanied by three different bands that had not practiced together before. Despite these difficulties he succeeded in finishing the three anthems in only one minute and twenty seconds.

His only regret was not being able to shake the Pope's hand.

== Professional resume ==
Napoleon's business card

High Chief Napoleon A. Tuiteleleapaga, Bachelor of Laws.

- Judicial Department - Government of American Samoa
- Grand Knight, International Mark Twain Society
- Chairman, American Samoa Historical Commission
- Chief Probation - Pre-sentencing Investigation Officer, High Court of American Samoa
- Liaison Officer between High Court & Village Magistrates
- Private Detective - Legal Adviser
- Musician - Composer
- Consultant: Domestic Relations, All matters relating to Samoa, Government, and People
- Government of American Samoa, East West Center Selection Commission
- Visitor Industry Board
- Copra Board
- Member: Samoa Church Unification Committee
- International Association of Investigators & Special Police Inc.
- Rosicrucian Order
- Sierra Club
- Loyola Law School Alumni

== Death and legacy ==
In the later years of Napoleon's life, He spent some time with his grandson, Napoleon Andrew Tuiteleleapaga II in America. Soon after he returned to the island of American Samoa. He enjoyed his visit to America when he had learned that his grandson was to have a male child. This filled his spirit and gave him true happiness! His words to his grandson Napoleon were, "The bloodline continues." He returned to American Samoa in the later part of December. During a New Year's Eve celebration, local children were lighting off fireworks in the village of Leone. He walked outside of his home to urge the young children by scolding them to quiet down. Soon after a firework was let off and reached him at his feet. The firework went off right in front of him. Due to the suddenness and explosion of the firework, Napoleon had a Myocardial infarction and died.

Many people attended his funeral on the island of American Samoa. He had a big funeral as well as many dignitaries from various places and countries attending his funeral.

Tuiteleleapga is often remembered for both his comedic tone and harsh disciplinary methods. He is a beloved son of Leone. Napoleon is survived by a vast clan of descendants. His family is scattered across the western United States and the Polynesian Islands. His former title, Tuiteleleapaga, is currently vacant.

== Sources ==
- Mead, Margaret . Samoa Yesterday, Today and Tomorrow. Napoleone A. Tuiteleleapaga
- Samoa: Yesterday, Today and Tomorrow.
- Tautai (Fisherman), a Samoan Catholic newspaper
