= Mariota Tiumalu Tuiasosopo =

American Samoan writer of its anthem (1905–1957)

Mariota Tuiasosopo
- Born: 1905; American Samoa
- Died: 1957 (aged 51–52)
- Known for: Wrote American Samoan national anthem

Mariota Tiumalu Tuiasosopo (1905–1957) was the writer of "Amerika Samoa", the regional anthem of American Samoa. Mariota's daughter, Seuva’ai Mere Tuiasosopo-Betham, was former associate judge of the high court of American Samoa and former director of the American Samoa Department of Education.
