= Amerika Samoa =

Regional anthem of American Samoa

English: American Samoa
- Regional anthem of American Samoa
- Lyrics: Mariota Tiumalu Tuiasosopo
- Music: Napoleon Andrew Tuiteleleapaga
- Adopted: 1950; 76 years ago

Audio sample
- Band instrumental rendition: file; help

Orchestral instrumental recording

"Amerika Samoa" (English: "American Samoa") is the regional anthem of American Samoa. Composed by Napoleon Andrew Tuiteleleapaga and written by Mariota Tiumalu Tuiasosopo, it was officially adopted in 1950.

== Lyrics ==
Samoan original

Amerika Sāmoa
Lo’u Atunu’u pele ‘oe
Oute tiu I lou igoa
O ‘oe o lo’u fa’amoemoe

O ‘oe ole Penina ole Pasefika
E mo’omia, e motu e lima, e... (Note: Sometimes written E mo’omia, o ou motu e lima.)
Ua ta’uta’ua, I agaʻifanua (Note: Sometimes written Ua ta’uta’ua au aga I fanua.)
Ma ou tala mai anamua

Tutuila ma Manu’a
Ala maia tu I luga (Note: Sometimes written Ala mai ia tu I luga.)
𝄆 Tautua ma punou I lou Malo
Ia manuia ia ulu ola
Amerika Sāmoa
Ole Malo ole sa’olotoga 𝄇

IPA transcription (Note: See Help:IPA and Samoan language § Phonology.)

[a.me.ɾi.ka saː.mo.a]
[lo.ʔu a.tu.nu.ʔu pe.le ʔo.e]
[ou̯.te ti.u i lou̯ i.ŋo.a]
[ʔo ʔo.e o lo.ʔu faʔa.mo.e.mo.e]

[ʔo ʔo.e o.le pe.ni.na o.le pa.se.fi.ka]
[e mo.ʔo.mi.a e mo.tu e li.ma e]
[u̯a ta.ʔu.ta.ʔu.a i̯‿a.ŋa.ʔi.fa.nu.a]
[ma ou̯ ta.la mai̯ a.na.mu.a]

[tu.tu.i.la ma ma.nu.ʔa]
[a.la mai̯.a tu i lu.ŋa]
𝄆 [ta.u.tu.a ma pu.nou̯ i lou̯ ma.lo]
[i.a ma.nu.i.a i.a u.lu o.la]
[a.me.ɾi.ka saː.mo.a]
[o.le ma.lo o.le sa.ʔo.lo.to.ŋa] 𝄇

English translation

American Samoa
You are my beloved country
Your name I shan't search for
You are my hope

You are the pearl of the Pacific
That is the lure of the five islands
Your customs and legends
are well known

Tutuila and Manu'a
Stand up and be counted
𝄆 Serve and bow down to your country
Let it be blessed and grow
American Samoa
The land of the free 𝄇

== Other American Samoa anthems ==
Since American Samoa is an American territory, the official national anthem is the Star Spangled Banner. An official Samoan translation of the Star Spangled Banner was made in January 2006.
