= Imene reo metua =

Imene reo metua: a Cook Islands / Rarotongan term; (literally 'hymn/s of the parent/ancestor'): they are formal traditional songs with tune and harmony, which are distinguished from the imene tuki style of the Cook Islands which are less formal, often grunted verses with nonsense syllables included for rhythmic effect. Most were brought to the islands by missionaries in the nineteenth century.

== See also ==
- 'himene'
