= Himene tarava =

Style of traditional Tahitian music

Himene tarava (Tahitian: hīmene taravā) is a style of traditional Tahitian music.

== Music ==
The style is started by one person singing a stanza. Other singers gradually join in and rhyme with the person. The men sing in a deep voice for punctuation, while the women sing in a light voice.

== History ==
One of the earliest forms of himene tarava originated in Tubuai, French Polynesia in 1844. Similar hymns originated due to the fact that the country was becoming more Christian since it became a French Territory in 1832.

During the 20th century, French Polynesians preserved the music. In the 1950s children were taught how to sing himene tarava.

== Forms of himene tarava ==
There are different forms of the music in each country.

- In the Windward Islands of Tahiti and Mo'orea, there are five vocal parts of the song.
- The islands of Rimatara and Rurutu use between 10 and 12 vocal parts.
- Raivavae and Rawa have thirteen lines.
- It is popular in the Cook Islands, where it is called "Imene Tuki".

== See also ==
- Himene
- Music of French Polynesia
- Music of Tahiti
