= Music of Polynesia =

The music of Polynesia is a diverse set of musical traditions from islands within a large area of the central and southern Pacific Ocean, approximately a triangle with New Zealand, Hawaii and Easter Island forming its corners. Traditional Polynesian music is largely an inseparable part of a broader performance art form, incorporating dance and recital of oral traditions; most literature considers Polynesian music and dance together.

Polynesian music expanded with colonial European contact and incorporated instruments and styles introduced through a process of acculturation that continues to the present day. Although the European tradition of hymn-singing brought by Christian missionaries was probably the most important influence, others are evident; Hawaii's influential kī hōʻalu (“slack key”) music incorporated the Spanish guitar introduced in the late 19th century, and later introduced the steel guitar to country music. Hip hop and R&B influences have created a contemporary Urban Pasifika music genre with a strong Polynesian identity and supported by the annual Pacific Music Awards in New Zealand.

Aloha Oe, celebrated Hawaiian song.

== Christian music ==
In the 1790s, Christian missionaries arrived in Polynesia for the first time. Hymns and other forms of Christian music were instituted, and native musical genres were driven underground and prohibited. Soon, traditional polyphonic singing was merged with Christian styles and church singing, and along with brass bands became an important part of Polynesian music culture across the Pacific.

== Popular music ==
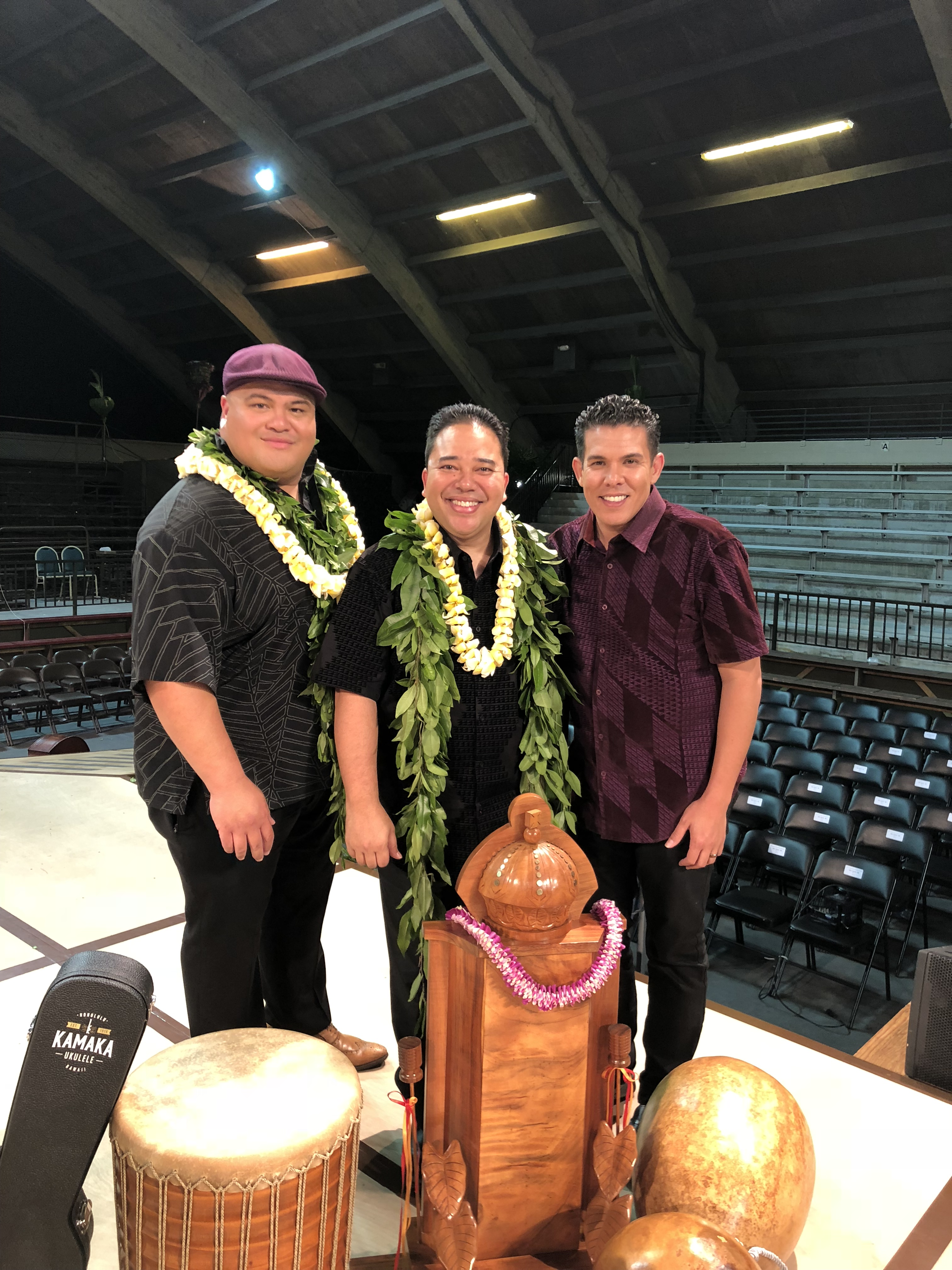
Kalani Pe'a Merrie Monarch 2019

Popular music in Polynesia is a mixture of more traditional music made with indigenous instruments such as the nose flute in Tonga, and the distinctive wooden drums of the Rarotonga, and local artists creating music with contemporary instruments and rhythms, and also a blend of both. In the 1980s, Fijian stars like Laisa Vulakoro and Lagani Rabukawaqa became popular across the Pacific.

Raiatea Helm is an internationally touring Hawaiian singer who has won has been nominated for the Grammys. Kalani Pe'a is a popular Hawaiian singer songwriter who has also won two Grammys. His music is traditional style Hawaiian songs, and include four-part-harmony oli aloha (greeting chants of appreciation) as well as contemporary Hawaiian music. He also translates popular songs into Hawaiian language. Na Hoku Hanohano Awards are music awards in Hawaii.

There is a form of reggae called Pacific reggae which features different instruments such as the ukulele and Pacific Island drums than reggae in other places. Herbs is a popular New Zealand band in this genre. J Boog (USA) is a reggae performer of Samoan descent based in Hawaii. Chris Boomer is a reggae artists from Guam.

Polynesian heritage artists feature in pop music culture including Dinah Jane (USA) of Fifth Harmony.

Some Polynesian islands have developed a cassette industry, most notably Fiji, Tonga and Samoa.

=== Steel guitar ===
Popular Hawaiian inspired musicians include steel guitarists Bill Sevesi and Bill Wolfgramm who led popular dance bands during the 1950s.

== See also ==
- Music of Hawaii
- Maori music
- Music of the Marshall Islands
- Music of Tuvalu
- Music of Tokelau
- Music of Tonga
- Micronesian music
- Music of Easter Island
- List of Oceanic and Australian folk music traditions

== Bibliography ==
- McLean, Mervyn (1999). Weavers of song: Polynesian music and dance. Auckland University Press. ISBN 186940212X.
- Linkels, Ad. "The Real Music of Paradise". 2000. In Broughton, Simon and Ellingham, Mark with McConnachie, James and Duane, Orla (Ed.), World Music, Vol. 2: Latin & North America, Caribbean, India, Asia and Pacific, pp 218–227. Rough Guides Ltd, Penguin Books. ISBN 1-85828-636-0
- Hebert, D. G. (2008). Music Transmission in an Auckland Tongan Community Youth Band, International Journal of Community Music, 2(1).
- Hebert, D. G. (2008). Music Transculturation and Identity in a Maori Brass Band Tradition. In R. Camus & B. Habla, Eds. Alta Musica, 26, pp. 173–200. Tutzing: Schneider.
