= Pate (instrument) =

Samoan percussion

Pātē
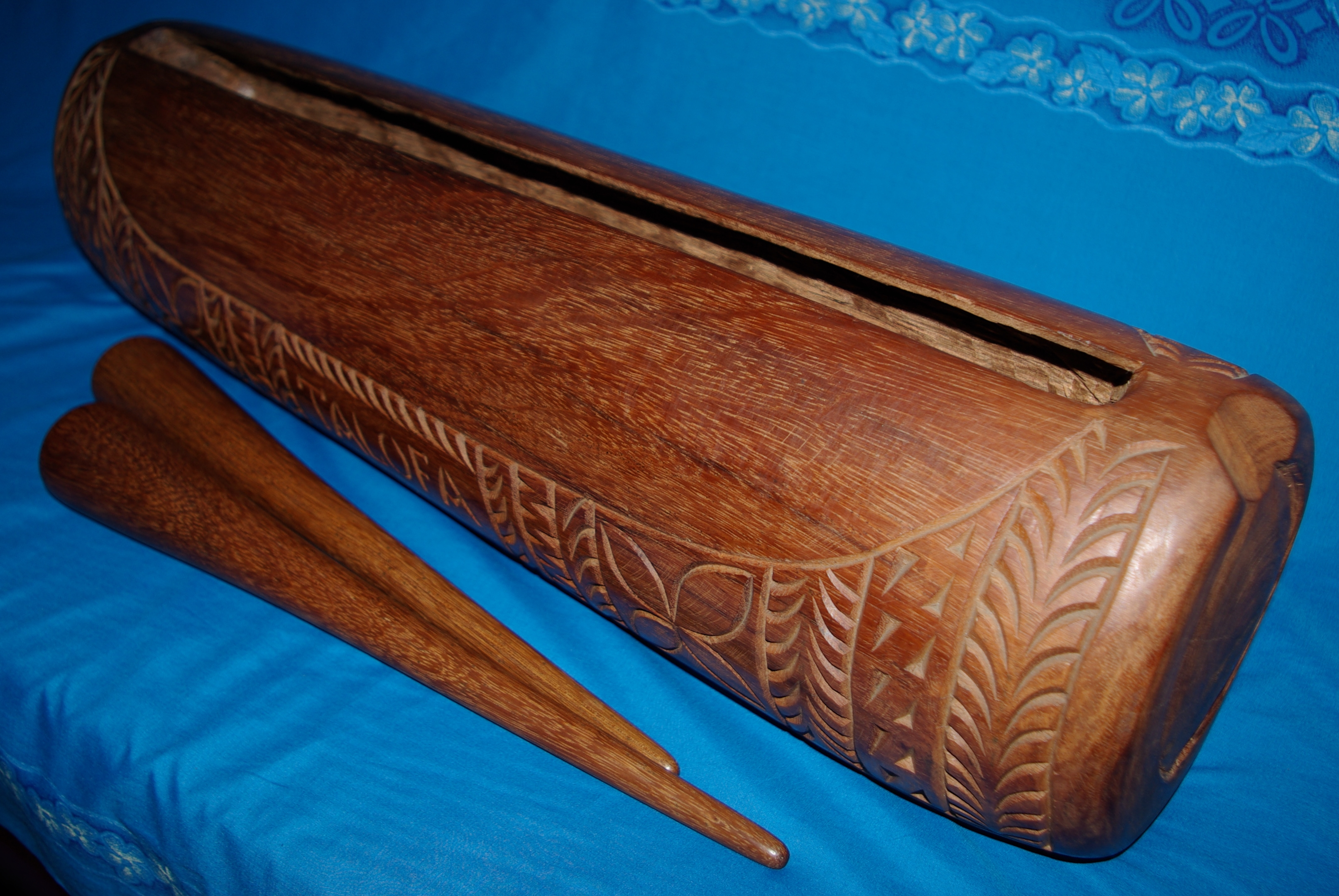
- Pātē from Samoa
- Other names: Pātē (Rarotonga) Tōkere (Aitutaki, Atiu) Tō'ere (French Polynesia) Kā'ara (Mangaia)
- Hornbostel–Sachs classification: classification needed

Related instruments
- Lali

The Pātē is a Samoan percussion instrument of Tahitian origin, named after the Samoan word for "beat" or "clap" "pulse". It is one of many Samoan log drum variants and is of the slit drum family, and therefore is also of the idiophone percussion family. It is made from a hollowed-out log, usually of Miro wood and produces a distinctive and loud sound. Different sizes of log drums offer different pitches and volumes, as well as striking the log drum in the middle or near the ends.

Talipalau drums are a Samoan variant a little larger than a pate drum and somewhat smaller than the Lali log drum variant. The dimensions of some Talipalau are large as 1.5 metres (4.9 ft) high and 3 metres (9.8 ft) in length; these Talipalau are a distant cousin to the Fijian Lali drum which were larger in size. The smaller pate was said to be introduced to Samoa by inter-married Tahitians whom visited and settled in Samoa some 500 years ago. However, in recent times the pate is used together with the other lesser known traditional log drum variants as well as the Samoan fala as percussive musical instruments. Because of the widespread distribution of Samoan music through the great Polynesian expansion, the use of the Pātē has gained much popularity among other neighbouring Polynesian Islands such as Uvea and Futuna, Tokelau, Tuvalu and Niue.

There are five main Samoan wooden slit drum variants:

- The logo, often carved straight from the carcass of giant felled trees, is the largest of the Samoan drum variants. Some of these drums were said to need upward of 70 men to carry them to the sea—such was the enormity of the drums that they could only be transported by flotation. When carved into a drum, the logo can only be played by being struck from the side, for instance by sliding the beater or very large log like playing stick across the top of the drum to hit the slit lip on the other side. The logo was used to announce the King of Samoa, High Chiefs and other monarchy in the past. The logo was also used to announce attacks and signals during war (see: Samoan Civil War, the Fijian Wars and also the Tongan Wars). Samoa also has recorded historical records of lesser known battles with the neighboring islands of Manono, Pukapuka, Tokelau, Tuamotu and Rarotonga, although these battles may be classed as independent isolated inter-island skirmishes between large familial clan groups.
- Lali are large drums that are always played in pairs by two drummers. One of them beats the larger of the two, called the Tatasi. The other drummer plays the smaller Lali in the rhythmic pattern called the Talua. Both slit drums are played with sticks called Auta. The Lali were said to be introduced 700 years ago via Fiji.
- The talipalau is a medium-sized Lali drum in between the normal-sized lali and the pate. The talipalau slit drum was introduced to Samoa via Tuamotu and Tahiti. It is now part of the island group now part of the French Polynesian Island chain. The archipelago of Samoa, Tahiti and Tuamotu developed inter-island familial bonded clans over the span of 800 years.
- The pate was introduced via Tahiti 500 years ago. It is the most well-known of the drum variants simply because of its portability and easy-to-use size, as well as because of its various different tones and pitches.
- The fa'aali'i-nafa is a smaller indigenous Samoan pate drum also made from Milo wood.

Tahitian warriors introduced intricate wooden log pate drumming to the Samoan Islands and the Cook Islands. In Rarotonga its origins have grown into deep spiritual roots that are still found in Cook Islands drumming today.

In Samoa log drums have traditionally been used in communicating over large distances in times of war and for signaling times of Sa, Chief and Village Meetings. Drums are also used in traditional song and dance.

In Tahiti the people have taken a more contemporary approach where drumming and dancing is used more for entertainment and tourism than traditional functions. For example, French Polynesia celebrates the annual Heiva i Tahiti festival where different tribes and island clan groups are able to compete against each other in a dance and drumming competition.

== Construction Process ==
First a segment of a hardwood tree trunk or thick branch is taken and stripped of its bark. Holes are then bored into the log in a straight line, from one end to the other, optionally leaving some space at each end. What remains in between the holes is then chiseled out, forming the characteristic slit. After this, the log continues to be hollowed out through the slit. Both the shape of the slit and the extent that the log is gutted will affect the tone and pitch of the pate.
