= ʻotuhaka =

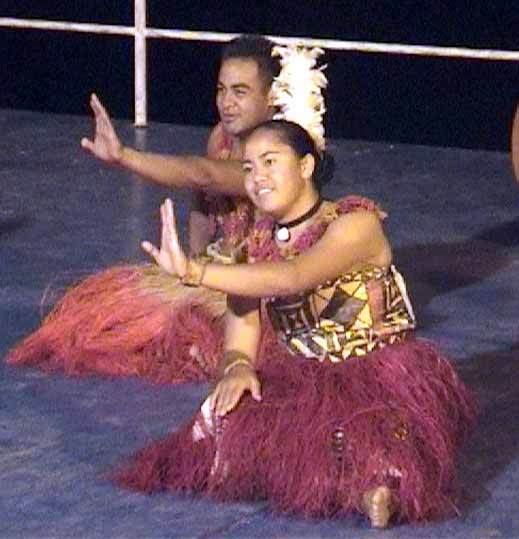

The ʻotuhaka (ʻotu-haka: row-of-dancemovements) is a traditional Tongan group dance wherein the performers are seated and make gestures with their arms only, with some accentuation from head and body.

Originally the ʻotuhaka was performed by older, chiefly ladies only, who were supposed to be too old to stand. Very often a ʻotuhaka was followed by an ula performed by their (standing) daughters or any young, chiefly ladies. In another respect, the 'Otuhaka was believed to be performed early in the morning to wake the King in a peaceful and subtle way. The performers sat crosslegged on the ground in a half circle with the guest of honour (the chief to whom they wanted to give homage) at the centre. Like the māʻuluʻulu part of the performance is on the beat of the music only, part of it is with additional singing of a chorus. The music by tradition, consists of beating with sticks on the tafua, bamboos, which are rolled up in a mat, just to keep the beat.

Nowadays the ʻotuhaka can be performed by men and women of any rank, but as dance it is decidedly less popular than its successor the māʻuluʻulu, as the words and the dance movements are prescribed by tradition. Yet every dance master who is conducting this dance has a different version which he will claim is the right one from ancient times. The people from Lapaha may have the strongest claim, as they are the guardians of the Tuʻi Tonga traditions.

== Lyrics ==
The words of the several verses are largely archaic and since they are derived from Samoan origin some are not well understood by their Tongan performers. Several older parts seem to have to do with seafaring. A few example verses.

A quite recent example, in modern Tongan:

Meʻa mai siʻi hauatea ka mau palua hotau kava	welcome to our little kava party as we knead our kava

A verse in old Samoan, expressing grief about the death of the spiritual king of Tonga:

ʻoi inu le ʻava ē, tau faʻasuluʻia ʻi le alofa ʻoi soi lena, soi lena mala tuʻi Tonga toki sala, lau manu lā ē	Oh drink the kava, let us get drunk on love oh here, oh here is a misfortune the Tonga king has just died, sacred birds are on the wing

A verse in old Samoan. For Tongans ʻAnilai and Siulafata may be names of unknown persons, but in Sāluafata harbour on ʻUpolu was an important stopover in ancient times:

ʻAnilai ʻā ē afe Siulafata, fai le tai, fana ē	There is the blowing tradewind turn in to Sāluafata, tell the tide to come in

A verse in modern Samoan, a quite recent addition as it talks about the annexation of Tutuila by the Americans (sailors= US Navy) in 1900:

Nau faʻalogo ʻi le tala ʻo Meleke ʻua sisi lona fuʻa ʻi lenei ʻeleʻele ʻalu ʻese, vave ʻese ma le faʻapelepele	I have heard the story about America it has hoisted its flag over this soil here go away, quickly away, in peace
ʻOiau lenei, ʻua ta toe faʻalongo, ʻua liu lea fono tama ʻo le seila, la, tātāʻotoʻoto ʻalu ʻese, vave ʻese ma le faʻapelepele	oh my here, I heard again, the decision of the fono has changed people of sailors, tra-la, they all lay down relaxing go away, quickly away, in peace
