= Music of Tahiti =

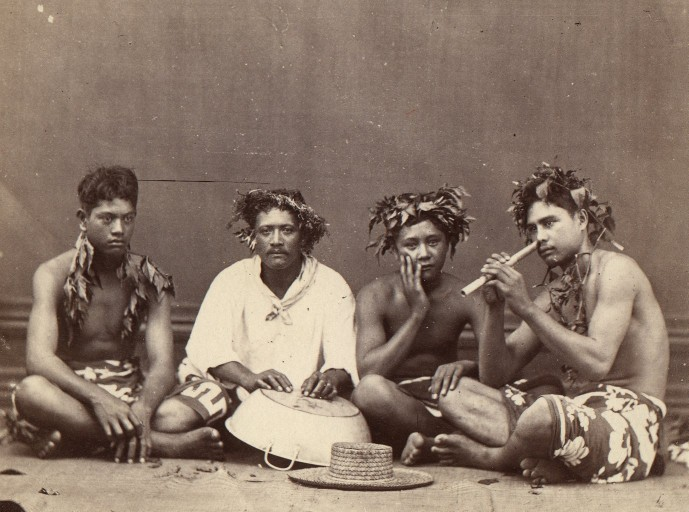
Vivo (nose flute) player

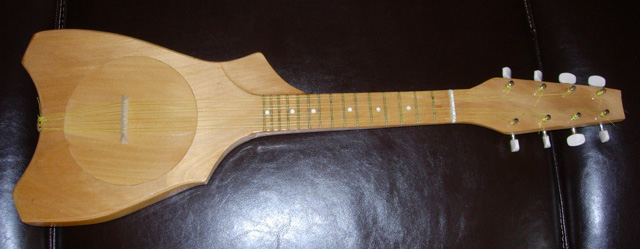
A Tahitian ukulele, or Tahitian banjo.

Prior to the arrival of Europeans, the music of Tahiti was dominated by festivals called heiva. Dancing was a vital part of Tahitian life then, and dances were used to celebrate, pray and mark almost every occasion of life. Examples include the men's ʻōteʻa dance and the couple's 'upaʻupa.

Professional dance troupes called ʻarioi were common, and they moved around the various islands and communities dancing highly sensually and erotically. In the early 19th century, however, colonial laws severely restricted these and other dances, which were considered immoral. Herman Melville celebrated one such dance (he called it the 'lori-lori') for its sensuality. They were replaced instead by genres of Christian music such as himene tarava. The word 'himene' is derived from the English word 'hymn' (Tahiti was first colonized by the English). Likewise, the harmonies and tune characteristics / 'strophe patterns' of much of the music of Polynesia is western in style and derived originally from missionary influence via hymns and other church music.

One unique quality of Polynesian music is the use of the sustained 6th chord in vocal music, though typically the 6th chord is not used in religious music. Traditional instruments include a conch-shell called the pu and a nose flute called the vivo, as well as numerous kinds of drums made from hollowed-out tree trunks and dog or shark skin.
