= Meʻetuʻupaki =

Ancient Tongan group dance

The meʻetuʻupaki (meʻe tuʻu paki: dance standing [with] paddles) is an ancient Tongan group dance, already reported by early European navigators like captain Cook. This dance has been traditionally designed for men although women may take part if there are not enough men. The meʻe tuʻu paki resembles a kind of war dance; albeit, it is done with little symbolic paddles as opposed to arms.

== Dress ==
The dress for this dance invariably is a large sheet of ngatu wrapped around the body from chest to ankles. A girdle of leaves around the waist (sisi) is often added.

== Movements ==
The movements are largely with the paddles in the hand, but the proper addition of the small and subtle movements with the head and legs make the difference between a good and poor performance. The paddles are not used for row like gestures, but are rotated around, moved to left and right or up and down. The dancers start in one row, maybe two if there are many, but from time to time split up the rows in what seems chaotic movements, yet at the end they come back again in perfect unison.

== Music ==
It is usually the dance master who operates a little slit drum (lali) to keep the beat, while the dancers themselves sing the song, possibly with assistance of others. The beat is always slow in the beginning, but goes faster and faster when the end approaches to excite the dancers and the public.

== History ==
Although danced by Tongans, the lyrics to the Me'etu'upaki seem to be written in other languages, supposedly Futunan and pre-Tongan 'Uvean. The Futunan language is the main culprit, as the words are understandable by Futunan speakers. There is also a version of the meʻetuʻupaki in Futuna, named the tapaki which closely resembles the dance in both singing, movements, rhythm, utilization of paddles and especially the speed of the song, which speeds up the longer the song goes, which is done in most dances in the 'Uvea and Futuna islands. . A link in this direction seems to be most likely that the dance may have originated in the Futuna and post-Tongan 'Uvea (now known as Wallis Island).

There are speculations that the meʻetuʻupaki was composed somewhere in the 12th to 16th century by an internationally oriented poet from the island of ʻUvea which honours the Tuʻi Tonga empire. However, when the Tuʻi Tonga, Kauʻulufonua I (Kauulufenua-fekai, K. the wild, in Futunan) at the time, had lost some decisive battles, this heralded the end of the empire and of the political function of the Tuʻi Tonga, which in turn forced the move to leave the meʻetuʻupaki to the island Futuna. Unfortunately, some of the parts to the story are still guarded as secrets, and we can only speculate on the true history from the limited resources we have from Tongan, Futunan, and 'Uvean sources. In addition the Futunans declared at the time that from then on, the Tuʻi Tonga title should be inferior to any Futunan title, and should a Tongan boat make it to Futuna, it would be destroyed then and there and offered to the gods. (This carried on even in the 19th century, as recorded by William Mariner (writer). There exists a Tongan proverb, which reads: vete fakafutuna (take apart in the Futunan way). This refers to something to be dismantled completely.

There is another speculation that the meʻetuʻupaki was some sort of a Tongan passport of olden times. When a boat from Tonga arrived on one of the conquered islands the crew was invited to show their typical dance to prove that they came from Tonga and not from somewhere else. As they then still had their paddles in their hand, using them in a dance seem quite straight forward.

== Verses ==
Verse 1

Kolulu e, Kolulu e
Kolulu e, sua mai mate
Fakapo, sua mai. Tu
E Fakapo, sua mai. Tu

Verse 2

'O Latu, Latu e
Pe 'i Tonga mu'a kae tokelau.
'Ia, 'i'i'a, 'i'i'a.
Kaleki pala pui le vaka,
Kae liua manu ole vaka,
Kae ta ko ia si'ene nga'uta.
'Ia, 'i'i'a, 'i'i'a. Tu

Verse 3

'O Taputea taputea mai
He uia mala mai letai
'O Taputea taputea mai
He uia mala mai letai.
'o sulu'ia laupeanga tuia,
E uia mala maile uia. Tu

Verse 4

Lakuta e, Lakuta e
Lakuta sikipoi e, sikipoi e, sikipoi e
Lakuta e, Lakuta e
Lakuta sikipoi e, sikipoi e, sikipoi e
Si ki 'olunga matau foe,
Ma'u e tata malie. Sikipoi e, sikipoi e. Tu

Verse 5

'O anu mai, fai mai
Tapu la e maile tai.
'E velo 'i sila, talava e
Vaka e sua, kite fonua.
Tafoe mai fe a fulisia lanumea
'E Tafea ki 'Uvea 'akatu.
Tonu mo tekau ki tu'a hakau
Fakahakea ki ai te vaka
Ko Tapunasili mo Longotevai
Fakangalo nai a e
Fakatakutaku he ta ko Tonga pasipasi mai
Fetuna ka toa e, 'io e

Verse 6

'O ngalutai ngalutai, 'o ngalutai ngalutai
'Utufia tefua te langi mana tefua fekai
Faka'oseia feliuekina holo e kina.
Kuo lava matautulia ia' taumalakia, 'isa ke
Pule mei vaka, 'ia.
Pule mei vaka kae tapa mai ama
Kae au mai kava kae ma'u te tangata
Kae to taulata, se ue i, se ue a.
Hifo le ala hakea le ala kae tau longolongo
Fakapuepue fano to mui tao, 'isa ke
'O ngalutai ngalu 'isa ke.
