= Lali (drum) =

Fijian wooden slit drum

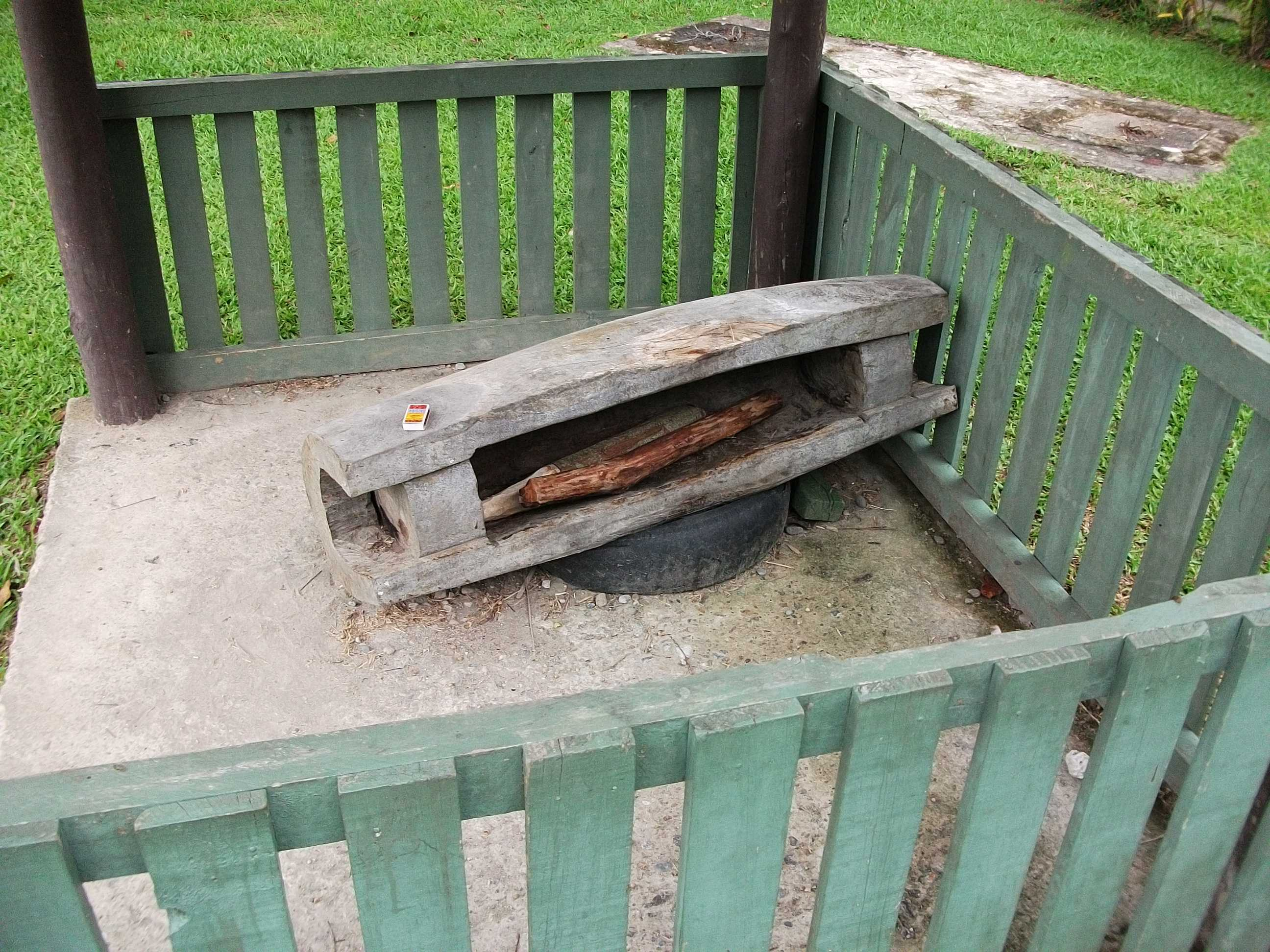
Fijian lali

A Lali is an idiophonic Fijian drum of the wooden slit drum type similar to the Tahitian Pate of Tahiti and Samoa found throughout Polynesia. A smaller form of the Lali drum (Lali ni meke) is used in music. Lali drums are now used to call the people of an area together, such as church services; the Lali is also used to entertain guests at many hotel resorts. The Lali drum is made out of wood and played with hands but, is most commonly played with sticks (i uaua) which are made out of softer wood so as not to damage the Lali. Historically, a larger and smaller stick were used together when playing the Lali.

Lali drums were traditionally made from resonant timbers such as Ta vola (Terminalia catappa) and Dilo (Calophyllum inophyllum) or in the case of sacred drums for spirit houses, Vesi (Calophyllum inophyllum). Portable war drums (Lali ni Valou) had two or three resonating chambers and sent complicated signals over the battlefield.

Frequently Lali occurred in pairs, one smaller than the other, and were played together, in counterpoint. This rarely occurs in contemporary usage. Sometimes special structures known as Bure ni Lali (lit. house for Lali) are constructed to keep the rain from filling the Lali and wetting the drummers.

== Gallery ==
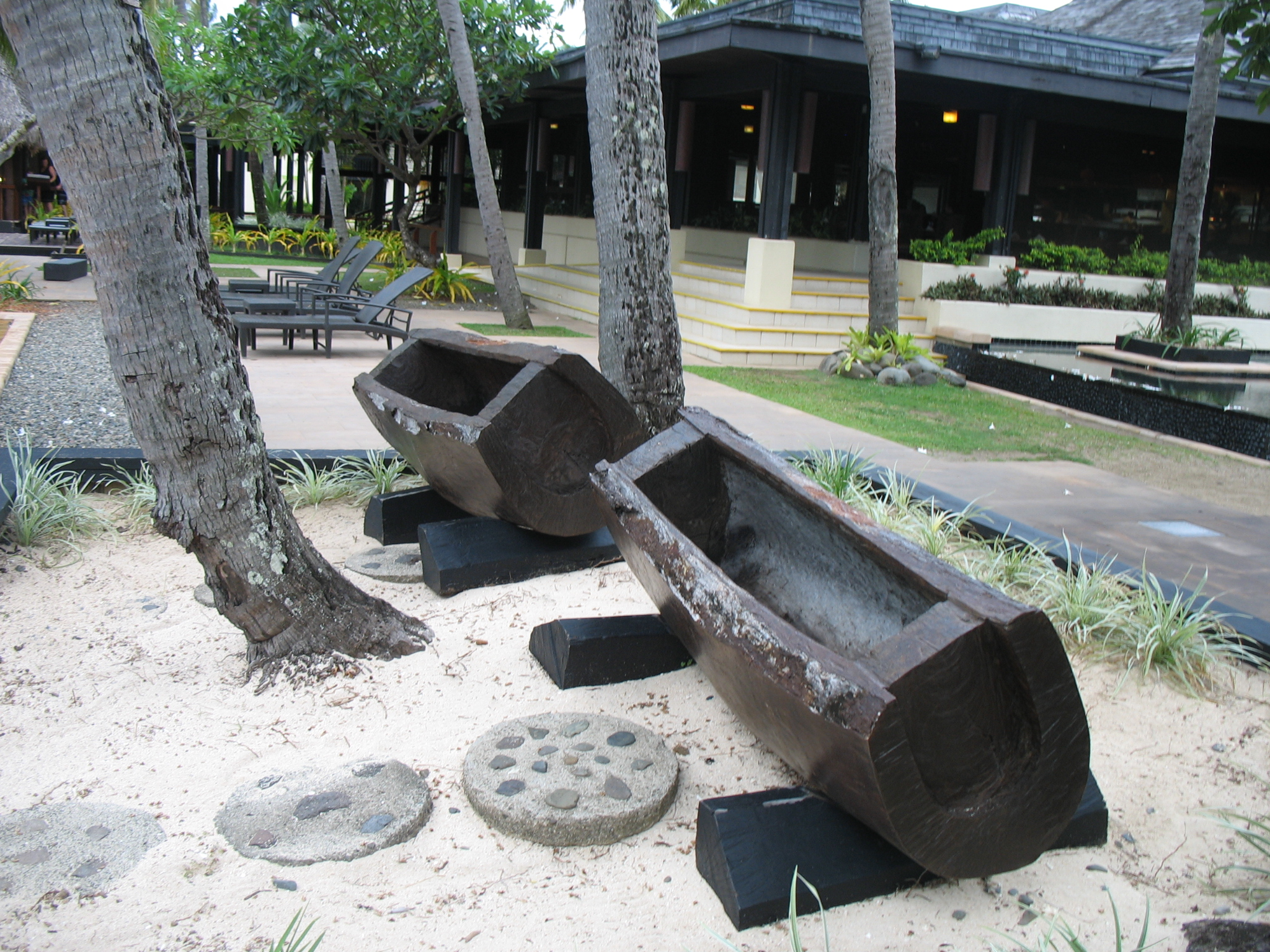
Lali drums at the Westin Hotel Resort and Spa, Denarau, Nadi.

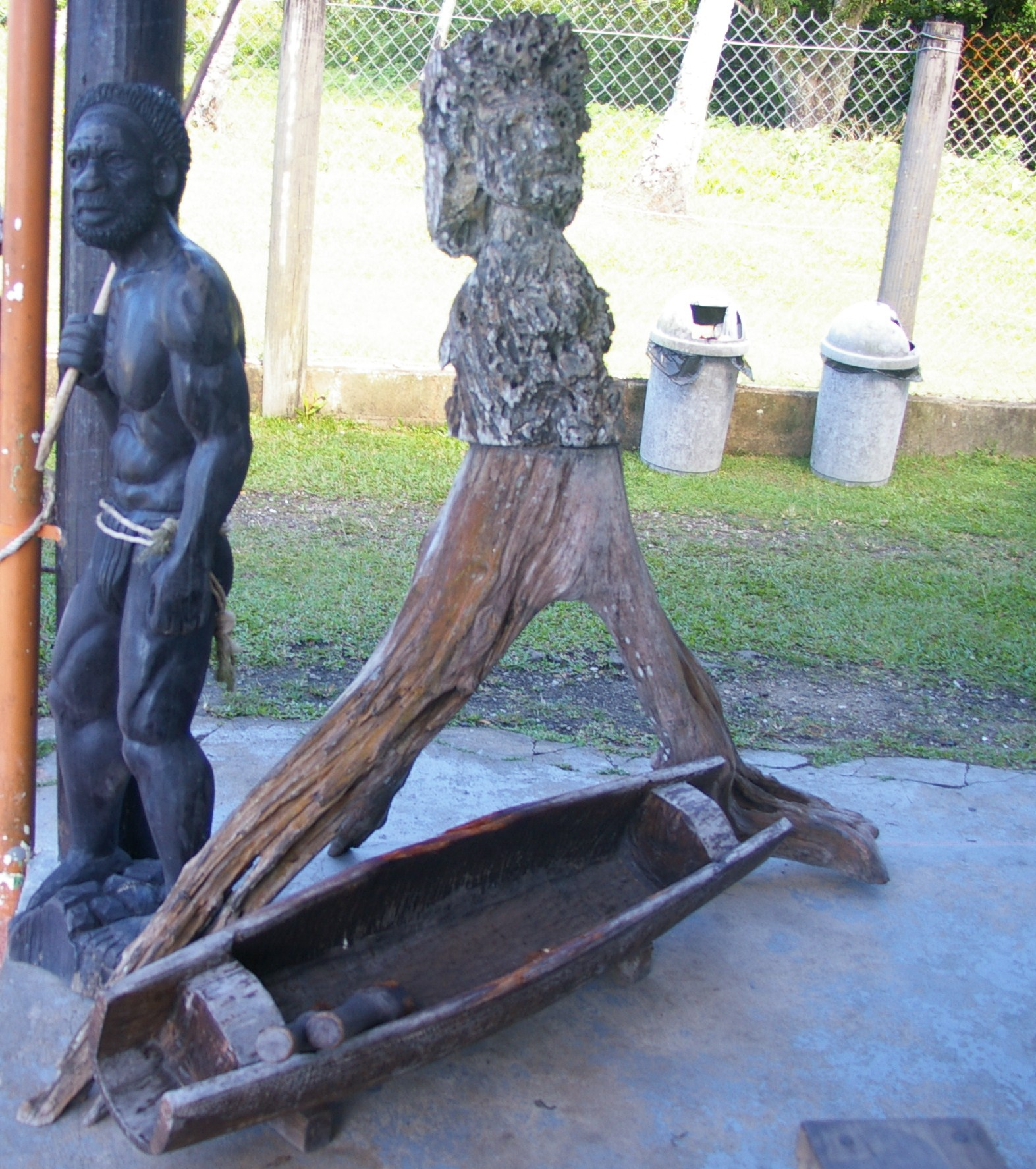
Lali outside a shop in Vatukarasa village, Coral Coast, Fiji.

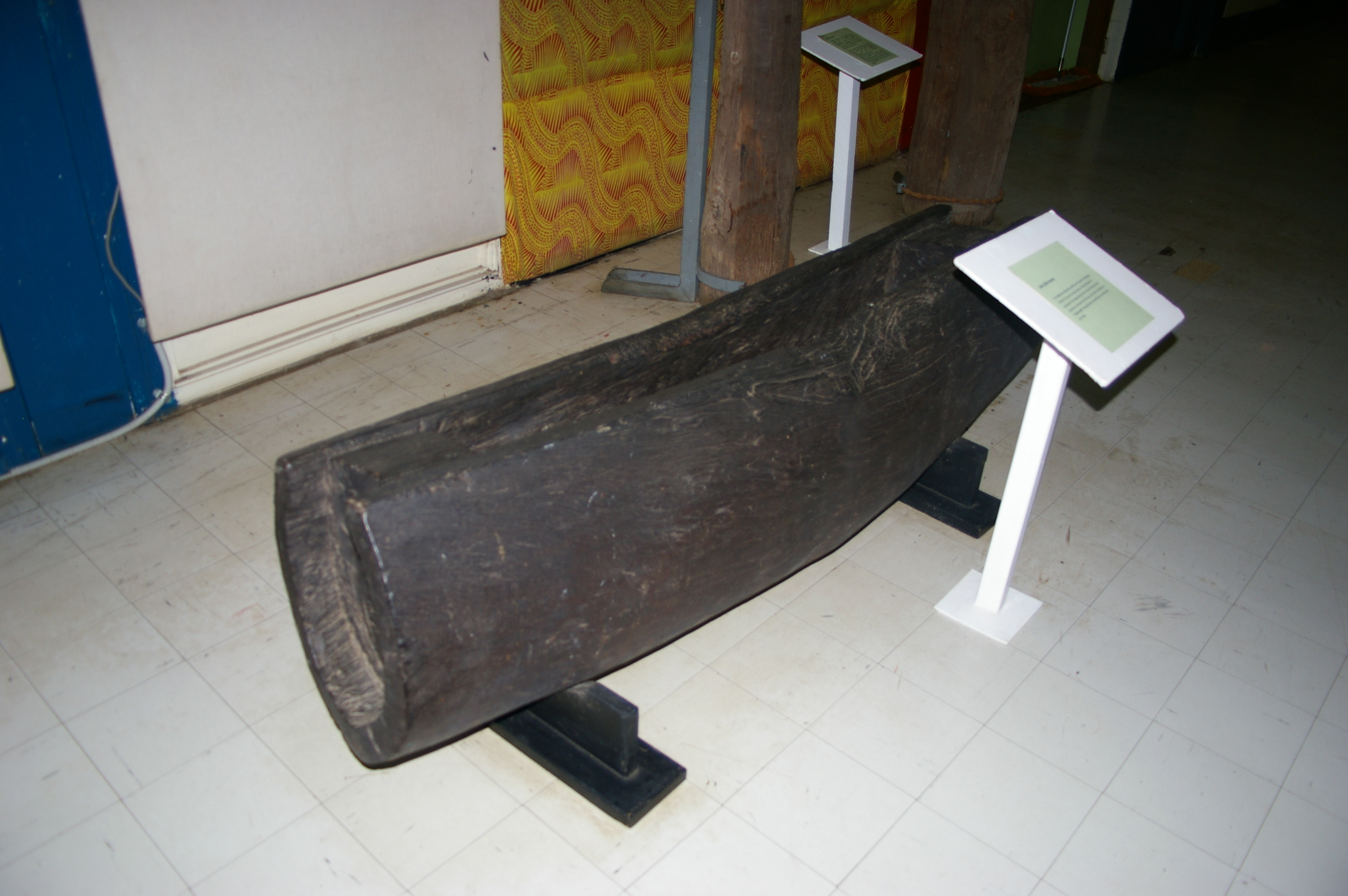
Lali drum in Fiji Museum, Suva. Formerly used by Wesleyan Methodist Church in Suva.

=== Further images ===
- Man playing Lali (historical photograph)
- Man playing Lali-ni-Meke dance drum (historical photograph)
