= Imene tuki =

An imene tuki is a traditional hymn of the Cook Islands. It is accompanied singing noted for a drop and raise in pitch at the end of phrases, and rhythmic nonsensical syllables, comparable to Scat singing. Similar syllables and improvisations are found in Tahitian Himene tarava.

== Hymn ==
The hymn commonly features four different harmonies. It contains a female soprano melody called a perepere, and a male bass line with rhythmic grunting. The performers also sway their arms left and right to the tune of the music.

== Location of performance ==
The song is usually played at church, and other religious locations. The dance is often called "Christian dancing", due its context. An example of one of these performances occurred at the Cook Islands Christian Church at Titikaveka, where it was sung by many native children.

== History ==
Imene tuki was documented by missionaries arriving in the island in the 19th century. They were impressed by the scattered sounds, rhythmic chanting, and swaying of the music.
