= Lakalaka =

Tongan traditional dance

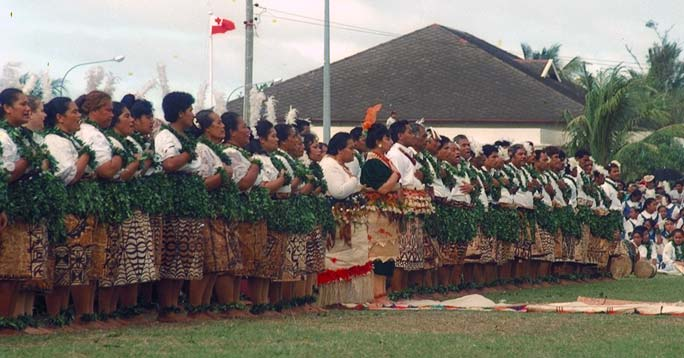
- The lakalaka from Kanokupolu for the 70th birthday of the king of Tonga. Princess Pilolevu Tuita as vāhenga
- Genre: Group dance
- Origin: Tonga

Lakalaka, dances and sung speeches of Tonga
- UNESCO Intangible Cultural Heritage
- Country: Tonga
- Reference: 00072
- Region: Asia and the Pacific

Inscription history
- Inscription: 2008 (3rd session)
- List: Representative

The lakalaka (walking briskly) is a Tongan group dance where the performers are largely standing still and make gestures with their arms only. It is considered as the national dance of Tonga and part of the intangible human heritage. It is the ideal dance at formal occasions, like the birthday of the king or the opening of a church.

== History ==
The current lakalaka seems to be quite equal to the ancient meʻelaufola (outstretched arms dance), of which descriptions exist from early European explorers, but the dance was forbidden by the missionaries for being too 'heathen'. This was confirmed in the 1850 code of King Tāufaʻāhau Tupou I. Notably, an article to that effect was absent from the 1862 code, although it was reinserted by 1885. In any case, none of these laws specified exactly what was meant by 'heathen dance'. There are reports of some huge dance festivals during these times, and no reports of any arrests. Admittedly, the pre-missionary pōmeʻe (night dances), after which couples disappeared into the bushes, did not occur anymore.

The lakalaka as it is known nowadays is usually accredited to have been invented towards the end of the 19th century by a high chief, who was a Methodist preacher as well: Tukuʻaho (1858—1897), from Tatakamotonga. Considering that the dance had never stopped being practiced, it would probably be better to say that he revitalised it. Tuku used missionary-approved nursery rhymes and added some simple gestures and steps. People agreed, and they came with their own suggestions, which were quite the same as those of the not-yet-forgotten meʻelaufola. Thus, a new dance was born, but still retained many of its original characteristics, and was approved by the missionaries.

== Choreography ==
The lakalaka is a living dance in the sense that new compositions are still daily made. Often when a celebration is coming up, a punake (poet) will write the lyrics to the occasion, assign music to the stanzas from a pool of typical tunes and then choreograph the haka (dance movements). Nevertheless, there are lakalaka which have become so famous that they can generally be used at any occasion. Among them several made by Queen Sālote, like Takafalu, Nailasikau, Sāngone, ʻOtu langi, Tuaikaepau, and so forth.

The dance movements of men and women are different. Most of the time the women make small steps to the left and right only, and their arm movements are small and fluid. Nevertheless, the arm movements are farther away from the body (laufola, outstretched arms) than for example with the māʻuluʻulu. The movements of the men are wilder and more vigorous. In addition to small steps, they may at times turn around, sit down or even lie down. In any case, how different their haka on first glance may be, both men and women interpret the words of the songs, but in a symbolic, allusive way as so typical for Tongan dance.

The dancers are standing in one or more rows, depending on the number of participants. 2 dozen per row is about fine. The men to the right, the women to the left as seen from the public. Behind them the chorus; the lakalaka is a sung dance, there is none or very little instrumental accompaniment. Sometimes in the middle of some lakalaka there are stanzas with a different type of lyrics and music than the rest, called the sipa. During the sipa the men move to the left, the women to the right, the two groups passing through each other, until their order is reversed. At the next stanza they move back to their original positions.

The dance normally starts with the singing of the first stanza by both dancers and chorus, which is a deference to the god, the king and the chiefs of the country. On the next stanza dancing starts. First calmly and subdued, but toward the end becoming wilder and wilder, while the tempo of the beat goes up as well. Everybody gets excited, both the performers and the public.

== Performers ==
The persons in the middle of the front row, on the division line between the two gender are known as the vāhenga (central performer). These are the persons with the highest rank of the group, often a prince or princess. The one who is perceived as really the most important, either the male or female vāhenga usually is also wearing a uniform different from the rest. The other vāhenga is then dressed the same as the other performers. The two last positions, that is at the very ends of the frontrow, the fakapotu, are also reserved for high-ranking persons. The second positions, beside the vāhenga are known as tāʻofi vāhenga and are for the next ranking persons. The third positions are filled with the best dancer of the male and female group respectively, the mālie taha. All the other positions can be filled up at the wish of the dancemaster.

It is for a dance group a high honour if a prince or princess or noble will participate as vāhenga. This can only be done on occasions where the king is the guest of honour, like his birthday or the centenary of a church and the like. Because all Tongan dances, especially formal ones like the lakalaka are in fact a deference to the chiefs. Tongan society is very stratified. Everybody has a particular rank. The royal family on top, the chiefs below it, and so forth. One cannot pay homage to someone lower in rank. Therefore, people higher in rank than the guest of honour at a particular celebration cannot dance. A king or queen can never dance.

== Dress ==
The normal dress of the dancers is as formal as the dance. Often an either white or black tupenu with shirt and a taʻovala loukeha, although this all may be largely covered by a sisi an ornamental girdle of leaves and fragrant flowers and/or a manafau a grassskirt, but in reality made of hibiscus fibers. In addition likewise made anklets, wristlets and neck garlands are worn too. The dancers from the village of Kanokupolu, however, always perform in their traditional folaʻosi, an about 2 meter piece of ngatu. The dancers of Tatakamotonga, who often perform last on big occasions, because they are claimed to be the best, always dress in black, as whether they still mourn for Tukuʻaho (see below) and his son Tungī Mailefihi, the consort of Queen Salote Tupou III.

Also worn is a tekiteki a little bunch of chicken feathers stuck in the hair. For the women the feathers are usually glued to one or two small sticks, pointing up, while for the men it is a soft tuft hanging down. Especially the women's tekiteki enhances the small, left-right head nods teki, they make from time to time on the beat of the music. A proper teki is considered as one of the most important actions in order to be classified as a good dancer.
