= Māʻuluʻulu =

The māʻuluʻulu is a traditional Tongan dance, performed by a group of seated men and women; stylistically, the dance form is a direct successor of the ancient Tongan ʻotuhaka having been synthesized with the Samoan Māuluulu which was imported during the 19th century.

The performers sit down in a row on the ground, crosslegged, usually the right leg over the left. If possible men and women alternate. To the left and/or right is/are the nafa (see below), behind them stand the langituʻa, the singers. On informal occasions the dancemaster may walk around, clapping his hands to keep up the rhythm and to encourage the performers. On formal occasions, like a presentation to the king, the dancemaster also stands in the back. Only when the dancemaster is the chief Malukava, he is allowed per tradition to be in front.

If there are many dancers, often the case when a school performs, up to 500 at a really huge occasion, they sit in staggered rows. The dancers of front row (which gets the most attention and therefore sits the best dancers or the ones with the highest social status) sit on the ground. The second row on a low bench, the next row on a higher bench, and so forth. The last row usually stands, or if that is still not enough, they may stand on benches and tables. If the dance is an effort of a local community, young and old perform. The youngest children then cutely sit at the ends of the rows.

In the ʻUiha tradition the arrangement is different: the women sit on the ground in the frontrow(s) but the men stand behind them and act more as in a lakalaka.

Like the ʻotuhaka, the māʻuluʻulu consists usually of a sung and a silent part. It starts with the beating of the nafa, huge drums made from discarded 200 litre, iron, fuel drums, covered with a leather skin. The nafa-master can make a whole show of it, hitting the drums with his two decorated sticks almost performing a dance himself. Once he has calmed down and he, and his helpers have settled down in a continuous beating of the drums, the tafua starts. This is the silent part of the performance in which the dancers are performing all the typical haka (dance gestures) of the main dance, as whether they want to show them off before you would be distracted by the singing later. In semi-formal performances this is the moment that the public, which has become māfana (excited), can come forward to put fakapale on the dancers they fancy to be the best or close family. On really formal performances this is not allowed, on really informal performances, often fundraising, the fakapale goes on about for the whole dance, which unfortunately distracts a lot. When the tafua is over the nafa usually stops and singing starts. Like all other Tonga dances, the gestures do have some relationship with the words, but are largely symbolic. Like in the ʻotuhaka the haka are supposed to be performed close the body, haka nounou (short armed) as opposed to the lakalaka. However the Vavaʻu tradition allows much wilder and wider arm movements. The lyrics of the song is usually made for the occasion, praising the object into the skies. A silver jubilee of a school, a birthday of the king, and so on. The music is very limited. There are about 10 different tunes which can be used in a māʻuluʻulu, so that to the untrained ear they all sound much alike. Once the song is over another tafua follows. At this time the tempo of the dance has been increased feverishly, and so has the excitement of the public.

A māʻuluʻulu takes around 15 minutes to complete. But it may have taken the performers 2 or 3 months to memorise the sequence of gestures. For a school there are daily sessions at the end of the class hours, for a community it will fill all their free nights, often combined with a faikava.
