= List of Central American folk music traditions =

This is a list of folk music traditions, with styles, dances, instruments and other related topics. The term folk music can not be easily defined in a precise manner; it is used with widely varying definitions depending on the author, intended audience and context within a work. Similarly, the term traditions in this context does not connote any strictly defined criteria. Music scholars, journalists, audiences, record industry individuals, politicians, nationalists and demagogues may often have occasion to address which fields of folk music are distinct traditions based along racial, geographic, linguistic, religious, tribal or ethnic lines, and all such peoples will likely use different criteria to decide what constitutes a "folk music tradition". This list uses the same general categories used by mainstream, primarily English-language, scholarly sources, as determined by relevant statements of fact and the internal structure of works.

These traditions may coincide entirely, partially or not at all with geographic, political, linguistic or cultural boundaries. Very few, if any, music scholars would claim that there are any folk music traditions that can be considered specific to a distinct group of people and with characteristics undiluted by contact with the music of other peoples; thus, the folk music traditions described herein overlap in varying degrees with each other.

Country	Elements	Dance	Instrumentation	Other topics
Belizean Kriols	brukdown		accordion - banjo - dingaling - guitar - marimba	
Garifuna	paranda - punta		guitar - scraper - shaker	
Guatemalan			marimba	
Kuna			gammu burui - guli	
Panamanian	copla - décima - gallina - llanto - mejorana - mesano - punto - saloma - tono - toque - torrente - valdivieso	amanojá - bunde - congo - cumbia panameña - escobillado - llanero - mejorana - paseo - seguidilla - socavone - suelta - tamborito - zapateo - zapateado	accordion - caja - churruca - flute - guitar - harmonica - maraca - mejorana - pujador - repicador - tambora - triangle - violin	cantalante - tuna
