= List of folk music traditions =

Folk music is one of the major divisions of music, now often divided into traditional folk music and contemporary folk music. There are many styles of folk music, all of which can be classified into various traditions, generally based around some combination of ethnic, religious, tribal, political or geographic boundaries.

- Americas: North, Central, South American, and the Caribbean.
- Asia: East, Southeast, Northern, Central, Caucasus, and South Asia.
- Europe: Northern, Eastern, Southeastern, Western, and Southern Europe.
- Middle East and North Africa: Southwest Asia and North Africa.
- Oceania and Australia: Polynesia, Australasia, Melanesia, and Micronesia.
- Sub-Saharan Africa: East, Southern, Central, and West Africa.

As well as dividing songs according to geography, it is possible to categorise them by subject matter:

- War song,
- Anti-war song,
- Tamang Selo,
- Sea songs, including sea shanties,
- Drinking song,
- Epic song,
- Work song,
- Love song,
- Child Ballads (tragic ballads),
- Children's song,
- Protest song,
- Murder ballad,
- Sporting song

Other folk music relates to social events:

- Christmas carol,
- Pub session

== See also ==
- Category:Contemporary folk genres
