= Valdivieso =

Valdivieso is a Spanish-language surname derived from the Valdivielso valley in Burgos, Spain. Notable people with the surname include:

- Alfonso Valdivieso (born 1949), Colombian lawyer and politician
- Antonio de Valdivieso (1495–1549), Spanish Roman Catholic prelate who served as Bishop of Nicaragua
- Domingo Valdivieso (1832–1872), Spanish painter
- Edison Valdivieso (born 1989), Ecuadorian footballer
- Enrique Valdivieso (1943–2025), Spanish art historian
- Francisco Valdivieso y Prada (1773–1828), Peruvian lawyer, magistrate and politician
- Gabriel Larraín Valdivieso (1925–2008), Chilean Roman Catholic bishop
- Guillermo Vivas Valdivieso (1881–1965), Puerto Rican journalist and politician
- José Valdivieso (1921–1996), Argentinian footballer and manager
- Juan Valdivieso (1910–2007), Peruvian footballer and manager
- Juan Pablo Valdivieso (born 1981), American-born Peruvian swimmer
- Luis Valdivieso Montano (born 1951), Peruvian economist and diplomat
- Luis P. Valdivieso (ca.1845–ca.1920), Puerto Rican politician
- Luz Valdivieso (born 1977), Chilean actress
- Mercedes Valdivieso (1924–1993), Chilean writer
- Pamela Valdivieso, Salvadorean beauty pageant winner
- Pedro Valdivieso (1922–?), Peruvian footballer and manager
- Rafael Valentín Valdivieso (1804–1878), Chilean priest and lawyer
- Ramón Valdivieso (1902–1996), Chilean medical doctor and politician
- Yesmín M. Valdivieso (born 1961), Puerto Rican politician, Comptroller of Puerto Rico
