= Comptroller of Puerto Rico =

Office charged with carrying out post-audits of the use of public funds in Puerto Rico

- Incumbent; Carmen Vega Fournier since October 14, 2025; 10 months ago
- Style: The Honorable
- Nominator: Governor
- Appointer: Governor with advice and consent from the Senate and the House of Representatives
- Term length: 10 years
- Inaugural holder: Rafael de J. Cordero Orta; July 25, 1952; 74 years ago
- Formation: Article IV of the Constitution of Puerto Rico; Law No. 9 of 1952

The comptroller of Puerto Rico is a constitutionally-created office charged with carrying out post-audits of the use of public funds in Puerto Rico. The comptroller is appointed by the Governor of Puerto Rico and requires the advice and consent of both the Senate of Puerto Rico as well as the Puerto Rico House of Representatives for a term of office of ten years and until a successor is nominated, confirmed and qualified. Former Comptroller Manuel Díaz Saldaña's was the longest-serving comptroller, having served almost 13 years, until his successor, Yesmín Valdivieso, was appointed by Governor Luis Fortuño, and remained as Comptroller for 15 years.

== Comptrollers ==
The following people have served as comptrollers:

#	Portrait	Name	Took office	Left office	Appointer
1		Rafael de J. Cordero Orta	1952	1961	Luis Muñoz Marín
2		Justo Nieves Torres	1961	1971	Luis Muñoz Marín
3		Basilio Santiago Romero	1971	1977	Luis A. Ferré
4		Ramón Rivera Marrero	1978	1986	Carlos Romero Barceló
5		Luis M. Malpica	1986	1987	Rafael Hernández Colón
6		Ileana Colón Carlo	1987	1997	Rafael Hernández Colón
7		Manuel Díaz Saldaña	1997	2010	Pedro Rosselló
8		Yesmín M. Valdivieso	2010	2025	Luis Fortuño
9		Carmen Vega Fournier	2025	Present	Jenniffer González Colón
