= Basilio Santiago Romero =

Puerto Rican politician

Comptroller of Puerto Rico
- In office 1971–1977
- Governor: Luis Ferré; Rafael Hernández Colón; Carlos Romero Barceló
- Preceded by: Justo Nieves Torres
- Succeeded by: Ramón Rivera Marrero

Personal details
- Born: April 12, 1928; Comerío, Puerto Rico
- Died: May 31, 2010 (aged 82); Hato Rey, Puerto Rico

Basilio Santiago Romero (1928 – May 31, 2010) served as the third Comptroller of Puerto Rico from September 1, 1971 to August 1, 1977. Santiago was appointed by Luis A. Ferré and was succeeded by Ramón Rivera Marrero.

In 1959, he formed a law firm with Max Goldman and Marco A. Rigau, known as Rigau, Goldman & Santiago. Between 1985 and 1988, he served as Special Adviser for former mayor of San Juan, Baltasar Corrada del Río. He was a law professor at the Interamerican University of Puerto Rico School of Law for nearly 17 years.

The former comptroller of Puerto Rico, Basilio Santiago Romero, passed on May 31, 2010, at the age of 82 at Auxilio Mutuo Hospital in Hato Rey, Puerto Rico.

== Works ==
- Tratado de instrumentos negociables: Ley Uniforme de Instrumentos Negociables de Puerto Rico y Ley del Código Uniforme de Comercio de los Estados Unidos

Political offices
Preceded by Justo Nieves Torres	Comptroller of Puerto Rico; 1971–1977	Succeeded by Ramón Rivera Marrero
