= Edison Valdivieso =

Ecuadorian footballer (born 1989)

Personal information
- Full name: Edison Gutember Valdivieso De Lucca
- Date of birth: 10 August 1989 (age 37)
- Place of birth: Guayaquil, Ecuador
- Position: Midfielder

Team information
- Current team: Barcelona

Youth career
- 2005 – 2009: Barcelona

Senior career*
Years	Team	Apps	(Gls)
2009–	Barcelona	9	(0)
- * Club domestic league appearances and goals as of 4 April 2010

Edison Gutember Valdivieso De Lucca (born 10 August 1989) is an Ecuadorian football midfielder currently playing for Barcelona.

== Clubs ==
Club	Country	Year
Barcelona Sporting Club	EcuadorEcuador	2006-2010
River Ecuador	EcuadorEcuador	2011
Alfaro Moreno	EcuadorEcuador	2012
Gualaceo	EcuadorEcuador	2013
Deportivo Azogues	EcuadorEcuador	2013
Venecia	EcuadorEcuador	2014-
