= Yesmín M. Valdivieso =

Puerto Rican politician

Yesmín Valdivieso

Comptroller of Puerto Rico
- In office May 12, 2010 – October 21, 2025
- Governor: Luis Fortuño; Alejandro García Padilla; Ricardo Rosselló; Wanda Vázquez Garced; Pedro Pierluisi; Jenniffer González Colón
- Preceded by: Manuel Díaz Saldaña
- Succeeded by: Carmen Vega Fournier

Personal details
- Born: January 1961 (age 65) San Juan, Puerto Rico, U.S.
- Education: Georgetown University (BS)

Yesmín M. Valdivieso Galib (born 1961) is a former Comptroller of Puerto Rico. Valdivieso was appointed by Luis Fortuño with advice and consent from the 24th Senate of Puerto Rico and the 28th House of Representatives.

== Education and career ==
Yesmín M. Valdivieso, holds a Bachelor's Degree in Business Administration with a major in accounting from Georgetown University in Washington, D.C. and the Certified Public Accountant certificate. Prior to working in the Government of Puerto Rico, Valdivieso worked as Senior Tax Manager at the firm of certified public accountants Arthur Andersen & Co. and as Undersecretary of the Puerto Rico Department of Treasury.

Political offices
Preceded by Manuel Díaz Saldaña	Comptroller of Puerto Rico; 2010–present	Incumbent
