= Hakgediya =

The hakgediya is a type of conch shell (the shell of a large marine gastropod mollusk) which is used as a kind of trumpet in the traditional ritualistic music and religious folk art-music of Sri Lanka, which has been somewhat influenced by Indian music. The hakgediya is an aerophone, or Susira (wind instrument or aerophone in the language of Pali). This instrument was used mainly in Theravada Buddhist artistic rituals which also involved other categories of instruments such as Ghana, Avanaddha, and Tat (idiophones, membranophones and chordophones respectively).

== Performance Rituals ==
The hakgediya is not used to perform melodic variation or to be the main instrument in the ritualistic pice. The variance found in the notes emitted by the hakgediya is in dynamic range (volume), as the player can choose to blow soft or loud, with a sharp or smooth attack, sustain, decay and release. In traditional Buddhist art music rituals, the main instruments are the drums pertaining to the Avanaddha category, the hakgediya is more of an accompaniment. This has to do with the Sri-Lankan belief that rhythm emanates from Brahma's teeth clashing.

The hakgediya is used in the ritual in honor of the Triple Gem (Buddha, Dharma, Sangha), right after chanting the Astakas, Sahali, and Curnikas which ensures blessings to all Gods. After the blessings, the hakgediya is blown three times in three cycles, along with auspicious drumming.
