= Melodic expectation =

In music cognition and musical analysis, the study of melodic expectation considers the engagement of the brain's predictive mechanisms in response to music. For example, if the ascending musical partial octave "do-re-mi-fa-sol-la-ti-..." is heard, listeners familiar with Western music will have a strong expectation to hear or provide one more note, "do", to complete the octave.

Melodic expectation can be considered at the esthesic level, in which case the focus lies on the listener and its response to music. It can be considered at the neutral level, in which case the focus switches to the actual musical content, such as the "printed notes themselves". At the neutral level, the observer may consider logical implications projected onto future elements by past elements or derive statistical observations from information theory.

== A multifaceted concept ==
The notion of melodic expectation has prompted the existence of a corpus of studies in which authors often choose to provide their own terminology in place of using the literature's. This results in an important number of different terms that all point towards the phenomenon of musical expectation:

- Anticipation
- Arousal
- Deduction
- Directionality
- Expectancy, expectation, expectedness, and in French attente
- Facilitation
- Implication / realization
- Implication (independent from realization)
- Induction
- Inertia
- Musical force(s)
- Previsibility, predictability and prediction
- Resolution
- Tension / release, tension / relaxation
- Closure, which may be used as the ending of the expectation process, as a group boundary, or as both simultaneously

Expectation can also be found mentioned in relation to concepts originating from the field of information theory such as entropy. Hybridization of information theory and humanities results in the birth of yet other notions, particularly variations upon the notion of entropy modified for the need of description of musical content.

Consideration of musical expectation can be sorted into four trends.

- A first trend may include publications written in the 1950s by Meyer, Younblood and Krahenbuehl & Coons that are concerned with objectivization and rationalization of the concepts of arousal, uncertainty, or non-confirmation of a prediction using information theory.
- A second trend may concern the more recent publications that include a step-by-step music analysis process at the neutral level, such as the generative theory of tonal music and Narmour's Implication-Realization model.
- A third trend may provide quantitative models based on computer algorithms, such as Margulis' model of melodic expectation or Farbood's model of musical tension.
- A fourth trend may group generalist theories whose focus lies neither in step-by-step processes nor in quantitative operations, and may include elements pertinent to the esthesic level such as cognition and neurophysiology. This includes Larson's "musical forces" and Huron's theory of general expectation.

== Leonard Meyer ==
Leonard Meyer's Emotion and Meaning in Music is the classic text in music expectation. Meyer's starting point is the belief that the experience of music (as a listener) is derived from one's emotions and feelings about the music, which themselves are a function of relationships within the music itself. Meyer writes that listeners bring with them a vast body of musical experiences that, as one listens to a piece, conditions one's response to that piece as it unfolds. Meyer argued that music's evocative power derives from its capacity to generate, suspend, prolongate, or violate these expectations.

Meyer models listener expectation in two levels. On a perceptual level, Meyer draws on Gestalt psychology to explain how listeners build mental representations of auditory phenomena. Above this raw perceptual level, Meyer argues that learning shapes (and re-shapes) one's expectations over time.

== Implication-Realization model ==
Narmour's (1992) Implication-Realization (I-R) Model is a detailed formalization based on Meyer's work on expectation. A fundamental difference between Narmour's models and most theories of expectation lies in the author's conviction according to which a genuine theory should be formulated in falsifiable terms. According to Narmour, prior knowledge of musical expectation is based too heavily upon percepts, introspection and internalization, which bring insoluble epistemological problems. The theory focuses on how implicative intervals set up expectations for certain realizations to follow. The I-R model includes two primary factors: proximity and direction. Lerdahl extended the system by developing a tonal pitch space and adding a stability factor (based on Lerdahl's prior work) and a mobility factor.

== Bimbot and al.'s System & Contrast model ==
Mainly developed at IRISA since 2011 by Frédéric Bimbot and Emmanuel Deruty, the system & contrast or S&C model of implication derives from the two fundamental hypotheses underlying the I-R model. It is rooted in Narmour's conviction according to which any model of expectation should be expressed in logical, falsifiable terms. It operates at the neutral level and differs from the I-R model in several regards:

- while Narmour's two fundamental hypotheses address the relations between three elements, the fundamental hypotheses leading to the S&C model address the relations between four elements. Therefore, it can be considered as more directly suited to the classical sentence and period forms, as well as to popular music forms;
- while Narmour's I-R model addresses one-dimensional relations, the S&C model includes relations on two potentially independent dimensions;
- the S&C model may encompass all aspects of the musical language, not only the melodic structure.

== Margulis's model of melodic expectation ==
Margulis's 2005 model further extends the I-R model. First, Margulis added a melodic attraction factor, from some of Lerdahl's work. Second, while the I-R model relies on a single (local) interval to establish an implication (an expectation), Margulis attempts to model intervalic (local) expectation as well as more deeply schematic (global) expectation. For this, Margulis relies on Lerdahl's and Jackendoff's Generative Theory of Tonal Music to provide a time-span reduction. At each hierarchical level (a different time scale) in the reduction, Margulis applies her model. These separate levels of analysis are combined through averaging, with each level weighted according to values derived from the time-span reduction. Finally, Margulis's model is explicit and realizable, and yields quantitative output. The output – melodic expectation at each time instant – is a single function of time.

Margulis's model describes three distinct types of listener reactions, each derived from listener-experienced tension:

- Surprise-Tension: inversely proportional to degree of expectancy; results in intensity or dynamism.
- Denial-Tension: proportional to the discrepancy between the expectancy of the most expected event and the expectancy of the actually perceived event; results in desire, drive, will.
- Expectancy-Tension: proportional to the degree of expectancy of the most expected event (in other words, if the listener had no idea what to expect next, the expectancy-tension would be low); results in strain or yearning.
