= Conclusion (music) =

Ending of a composition; may take the form of a coda or outro

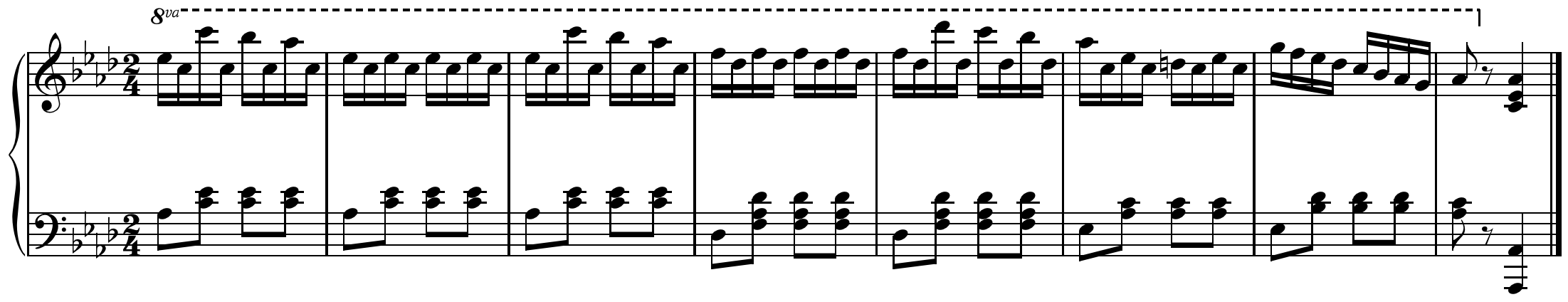
"Jingle Bells"'s outro

In music, the conclusion is the ending of a composition and may take the form of a coda or outro.

Pieces using sonata form typically use the recapitulation to conclude a piece, providing closure through the repetition of thematic material from the exposition in the tonic key. In all musical forms other techniques include "altogether unexpected digressions just as a work is drawing to its close, followed by a return...to a consequently more emphatic confirmation of the structural relations implied in the body of the work."

For example:

- The slow movement of Bach's Brandenburg Concerto No. 2, where a "diminished-7th chord progression interrupts the final cadence."
- The slow movement of Symphony No. 5 by Beethoven, where, "echoing afterthoughts", follow the initial statements of the first theme and only return expanded in the coda.
- Varèse's Density 21.5, where partitioning of the chromatic scale into (two) whole tone scales provides the missing tritone of b implied in the previously exclusive partitioning by (three) diminished seventh chords.

== Coda ==
Coda (Italian for "tail", plural code) is a term used in music in a number of different senses, primarily to designate a passage which brings a piece (or one movement thereof) to a conclusion.

== Outro ==
An outro (sometimes "outtro", also "extro") is the opposite of an intro. Outro is a blend of out and intro.

The term is typically used only in the realm of popular music. It can refer to the concluding track of an album or to an outro-solo, an instrumental solo (usually a guitar solo) played as the song fades out or until it stops.

== Repeat and fade ==
Repeat and fade is a musical direction used in sheet music when more than one repeat of the last few measures or so of a piece is desired with a fade-out (like something traveling into the distance and disappearing) as the manner in which to end the music. It originated as a sound effect made possible by the volume controls on sound recording equipment and on the sound controls for speaker output. No equivalent Italian term was in the standard lexicon of musical terms, so it was written in English, the language of the musician(s) who developed the technique. It is very difficult to approximate this effect on an instrument such as the piano, but instrumentalists can simulate it by thinning the musical texture while applying diminuendo within the limits of their instruments, and by taking advantage of the open-ended feeling of an unresolved harmony or melodic tone at the end.

It is in the family of terms and signs that indicate repeated material, but it does not substitute for any of them, and it would be incorrect to describe it as a "shortcut" to any of the other repeat signs (such as Dal segno). The direction is to be taken literally: while repeating the music contained within the section annotated "repeat and fade", the player(s) should continue to play/repeat, and the mixer or player(s) should fade the volume while the player(s) repeat the appropriate musical segments, until the song has been faded out (usually by faders on the mixing board).

== See also ==
- Da capo
- Epilogue
