= Implication-Realization =

The Implication-Realization (I-R) model of melodic expectation was developed by Eugene Narmour as an alternative to Schenkerian analysis centered less on music analysis and more on cognitive aspects of expectation. The model is one of the most significant modern theories of melodic expectation, going into great detail about how certain melodic structures arouse particular expectations.

== History ==
Meyer (1956) applied Gestalt psychology principles to musical expectation, resulting in his ideas about completion, closure, and his Law of Good Continuation. In 1977, Narmour's book explicated problems he had with Schenkerian analysis and sketched ideas for a new model of analysis based on musical expectation as informed by the work of Meyer. Narmour mentioned a forthcoming book, The Melodic Structure of Tonal Music, but it did not appear. Much time passed without the alternative theory, but finally in 1989 Narmour published his I-R model, detailed in the 1990 and 1992 books.

As of 2007, Narmour is working on a new book, which will extend the I-R theory to the parameters of harmony and rhythm and explore potential applications to the analysis of performance.

== Theory ==
Narmour's I-R model was published in two separate books, dealing with "basic melodic structures" and "melodic complexity". Each book is quite complex; only a few key points are mentioned here. The Music Perception review by Ian Cross and the article by Schellenberg provide introductions to the theory.

=== Basic melodic structures ===
==== General claims ====
The Analysis and Cognition of Basic Melodic Structures: The Implication-Realization Model begins with two general claims. The first is given by "two universal formal hypotheses" describing what listeners expect. The process of melody perception is based on "the realization or denial" of these hypotheses (1990, 3):

1. A + A → A
2. A + B → C

Here, A, B, and C are melodic items of either form, interval patterns, or pitches. A + A → A indicates that hearing two similar items yields an expectation of repetition of the item. A + B → C, on the other hand, indicates that hearing two different items yields an expected change in the implied item.

The second claim is that the "forms" above function to provide either closure or nonclosure. Narmour goes on to describe the five melodic archetypes of his theory:

1. process [P] or iteration (duplication) [D] (A + A without closure)
2. reversal [R] (A + B with closure)
3. registral return [aba] (exact or nearly exact return to same pitch)
4. dyad (two implicative items, as in 1 and 2, without a realization)
5. monad (one element which does not yield an implication)

Central to the discussion is the notion of registral direction (direction of motion) and size of intervals between pairs of pitches. [P] (process) refers to motion in the same registral direction combined with similar intervallic motion (two small intervals or two large intervals). [D] refers to identical intervallic motion with lateral registral direction. [R] refers to changing intervallic motion (large to smaller) with different registral directions.

P, D, and R only account for cases where registral direction and intervalic motion are working in unison to satisfy the implications. When one of these two factors is denied, there are more possibilities, the five archetypal derivatives:

1. intervallic process [IP]: small interval to similar small interval, different registral directions
2. registral process [VP]: small to large interval, same registral direction
3. intervallic reversal [IR]: large interval to small interval, same registral direction
4. registral reversal [VR]: large interval to larger interval, different registral direction
5. intervallic duplication [ID]: small interval to identical small interval, different registral directions

Each of these 8 fundamental symbols can refer to a "prospective or retrospective dimension". The symbols are enclosed in parentheses like so: (VR) to indicate a "retrospective realization". Narmour (1990, 6) considers these symbols to be representative of cognitive structures: "As symbological tokens, all sixteen prospective and retrospective letters purport to represent the listener's encoding of many of the basic structures of melody."

From these foundations, the theory gets more detailed, and problems of style, pitch, harmony, rhythm, etc. are all discussed.

==== Five principles ====
Schellenberg's work has involved testing and simplifying specific implementations of the I-R model. His 1997 article gives an overview of the I-R theory that describes it in terms of five governing principles:

1. Registral direction
2. Intervallic difference
3. Registral return
4. Proximity
5. Closure

===== 1. Registral direction =====
- Small intervals imply continuation of pitch direction
- Large intervals imply a change of direction

===== 2. Intervallic difference =====
- Small intervals imply similar-sized realized intervals
  - When the registral direction changes, a "small" realized interval is defined as the original interval size +/- 2 semitones
  - In the absence of direction change, a "small" interval is the original interval +/- 3 semitones
- Large implicative intervals imply smaller realized intervals

===== 3. Registral return =====
This is the melodic archetype aba or aba\' where the second tone of a realized interval is very similar to the original pitch (within 2 semitones). This archetype describes symmetric or near-symmetric patterns such as C-G-C#. Patterns are less archetypical as they deviate more from this symmetry.

===== 4. Proximity =====
- Small realized intervals are more implied than large intervals. Also, implications are stronger for smaller-sized intervals.

===== 5. Closure =====
Closure describes how listeners segment melodies based on pitch direction and interval size. Closure occurs in two cases:

- Melody changes direction. That is, implicative and realized intervals are in different directions.
- A larger implicative interval is followed by a smaller realized interval.
