= Philip Tagg =

British musicologist and educator (1944–2024)

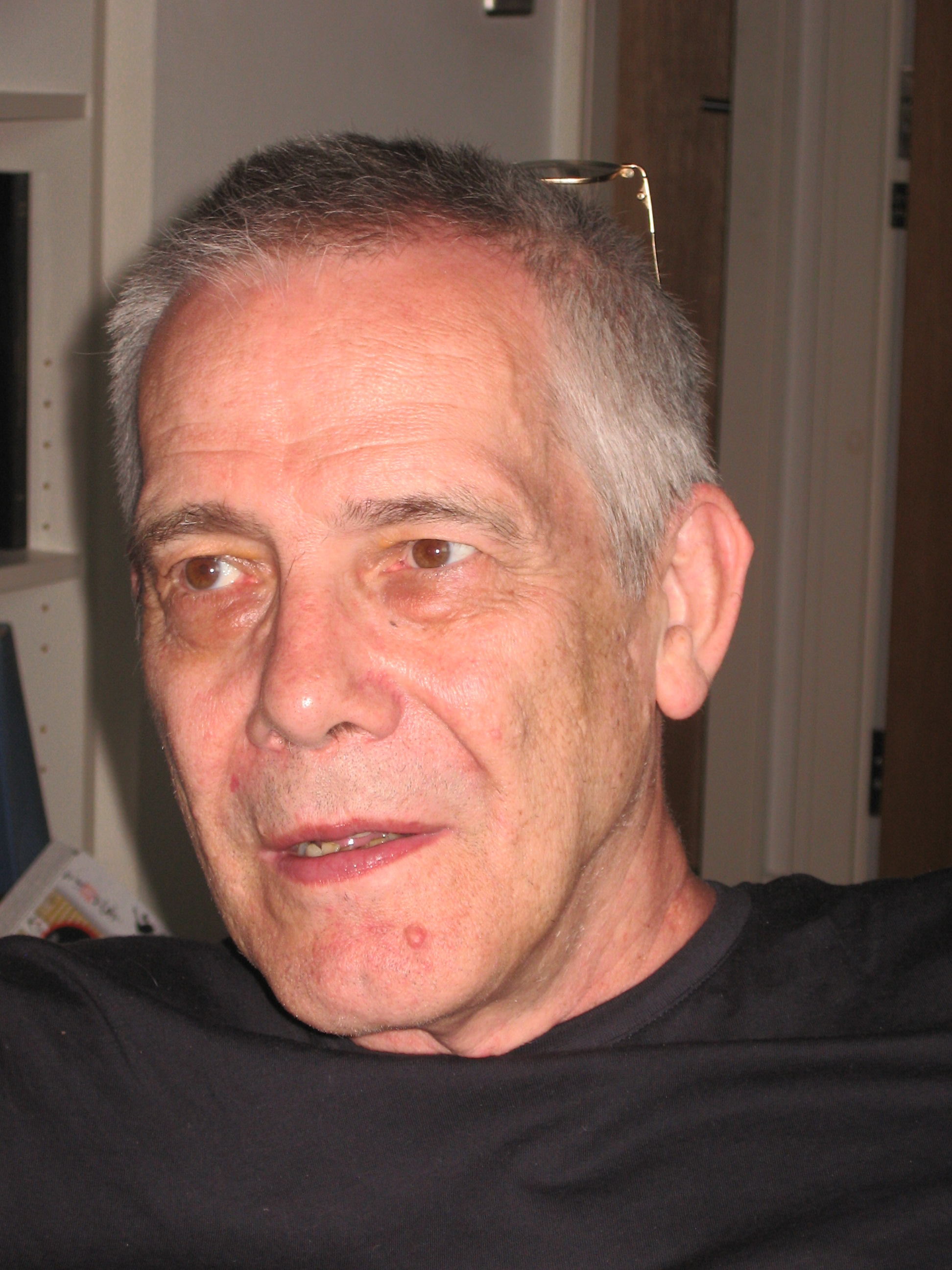
- Tagg in 2014
- Born: 22 February 1944; Oundle, Northamptonshire, England
- Died: 9 May 2024 (aged 80)
- Occupations: Writer, educator
- Known for: Analysis of popular music

Academic background
- Education: University of Manchester
- Thesis: Pop Music as a Possible Medium in Secondary School Education (1966)

Academic work
- Discipline: Musicologist
- Institutions: International Association for the Study of Popular Music (IASPM)
- Notable works: Everyday Tonality
- Website: tagg.org/index.html

Philip Tagg (22 February 1944 – 9 May 2024) was a British musicologist, writer and educator. He was co-founder of the International Association for the Study of Popular Music (IASPM) and author of several influential books on popular music and music semiotics.

== Biography ==
Tagg attended The Leys School in Cambridge in 1957–1962. He has mentioned his organ teacher, Ken Naylor, as particularly influential on his development as a musician and thinker. He then studied Music at the University of Cambridge (1962–65), and thereafter Education at the University of Manchester (1965–66). Tagg had some success as a choral composer during these early years. For example, on Trinity Sunday 1963, Tagg’s anthem Duo Seraphim was performed at Matins by the Choir of King's College, Cambridge under David Willcocks. His Preces and Responses were also broadcast by the BBC from the Edington Festival in 1964. Tagg also worked as volunteer at the Aldeburgh Festival in 1963. During this period he also played piano in a Scottish country dance ensemble, as well as in two pop-rock/soul/R&B bands.

Dismayed at the prospect of becoming a music teacher in 1966, Tagg moved to Sweden where he taught English in Filipstad while running a youth club and playing keyboards in two local bands (1966–68). Deciding to retrain as a language teacher, Tagg then attended the University of Gothenburg (1968–71), while also both singing in and arranging for Göteborgs Kammarkör. In 1969 he met Swedish musicologist Jan Ling who, realising that Tagg had experience in both the classical and popular spheres, asked him to help with the new music teacher training programme (SÄMUS) that the Swedish government had asked Ling to set up in Göteborg.

At SÄMUS (1971–77), and later at the Department of Musicology of the University of Gothenburg (1977–91), Tagg taught (aural) Keyboard Accompaniment, Music Theory, and Music & Society. Problems encountered in this work provoked him to develop analysis methods addressing the specificities of structure and meaning in various types popular music, e.g. the “Kojak thesis” (1979) and the reception tests at the basis of his book Ten Little Title Tunes (2003). Tagg was at this time also songwriter and keyboard player in the left-wing “rock cabaret” band Röda Kapellet (1972–76). In June 1981 he co-organised, together with Gerard Kempers and David Horn, the first international conference on popular music studies in Amsterdam, as a result of which IASPM (International Association for the Study of Popular Music) was formed.

In April 1991, Tagg returned to the UK where he established the basis of what became EPMOW (Encyclopedia of Popular Music of the World). In 1993 he was appointed Senior Lecturer at the Institute of Popular Music (IPM) of the University of Liverpool, where, until 2002, he taught such subjects as Popular Music Analysis, Music and the Moving Image and History of Popular Music.

In 2000 Bob Clarida and Philip Tagg set up the Mass Media Music Scholars' Press (MMMSP) as a not-for-profit corporation registered in the state of New York. Its purpose is, using Fair Use legislation, to disseminate scholarly musicological writings on music in the mass media.

Dismayed by the increasing rigidity of the UK's managerialist university system, Tagg moved once again in 2002, this time to take up a professorship at the Université de Montréal where his main brief was to establish popular music studies in the university's Faculté de musique (2002–2009). In January 2010 he returned as a pensioner to the UK, since when he has been writing books and producing his “edutainment videos”.

Tagg was Visiting Professor of Music at Leeds Beckett University and the University of Salford. He was also one of the main figures behind the foundation of the Network for the Inclusion of Music in Music Studies (NIMiMs) in January 2015.

Tagg died after a brief illness on 9 May 2024, at the age of 80.

== Semiotic music analysis ==
Tagg was probably best known for his work in the field of music analysis. Using mainly pieces of popular music as analysis objects, he stresses the importance of non-notatable parameters of expression and of vernacular perception in understanding "how music communicates what to whom with what effect" in today's world. He has adapted Charles Seeger's notion of the museme to demonstrate how combinations of such units are used to create both syncritic (intensional) structures inside the extended present, and diatactical (extensional) ones over time. These combinatory structures can be understood, he argues, with the help of an overall sign typology consisting of anaphones (sonic, tactile, kinetic, social), style flags (style determinants, genre synecdoches, etc.) and episodic markers. The semiotic theory is basically Peircean but it draws also on Umberto Eco's theories of connotation. The actual analysis method is based on both metamusical information about the analysis object (reception tests, opinions, ethnographic observation, etc.) to arrive at paramusical fields of connotation (PMFCs), and on intertextuality. The latter involves identifying sounds observed in the analysis object with sounds in other music – interobjective comparison material (IOCM) – and in connecting that IOCM with its own PMFCs. Tagg argues that this sort of music semiotics is musogenic, not logogenic, i.e. suited to expression in music rather than in words, and that the combination of intersubjective and interobjective procedures can, inside a given cultural context, provide reliable insights into the mediation of meaning through music.

== Music theory reform ==
In 2011 Tagg started working for the reform of music theory terminology on two fronts. His views were:

1. That conventional music theory terminology, based mainly on the euroclassical and jazz repertoires, is often both inaccurate and ethnocentric – he cites the widespread use of tonality to denote just one type of tonality and its simultaneous conceptual opposition to both atonality and modality as one example of the problem; and
2. That the denotation of non-notated musical structures, rarely covered in conventional music theory, needs urgent attention.

== Awards ==
In June 2014, Tagg received a Lifetime Recognition Award from the International Semiotics Institute at its conference in Kaunas, Lithuania.

== Selected bibliography ==
- 1966. Popular music as a possible medium in secondary school education Cert. Ed. diss., University of Manchester.
- 1979. Kojak – 50 Seconds of TV Music: see 2000a.
- 1987. "Musicology and the Semiotics of Popular Music". In Semiotica, 66 (1/3): 279–298.
- 1993. "‘Universal’ music and the case of death". In Critical Quarterly, 1993
- 1998. "The Göteborg connection: Lessons in the history and politics of popular music education and research". In Popular Music, 17/2: 219–242.
- 2000a. Kojak – 50 Seconds of TV Music – Towards the analysis of affect in popular music (2nd edition of PhD thesis from 1979). New York & Montréal: MMMSP, 424 pp. ISBN 978-0-9701684-9-8.
- 2000b. Fernando the Flute: analysis of the music in an Abba mega-hit. New York & Montréal: MMMSP, 144 PP. ISBN 978-0-9701684-1-2.
- 2003 (with Bob Clarida) Ten Little Title Tunes: Towards a musicology of the mass media. New York & Montréal: MMMSP, xvi+898 pp. ISBN 0-9701684-2-X.
- 2009. Everyday Tonality. New York & Montréal: MMMSP. iv + 334 pp. ISBN 9780970168443. Italian translation: La tonalità di tutti i giorni: armonia, modalità, tonalità nella popular music: un manuale, edited by Franco Fabbri, translated by Jacopo Conti. Milano: Il Saggiatore, 2011. 432 pp. ISBN 9788842816690.
- 2013. Music's Meanings: a modern musicology for non-musos. New York & Huddersfield: MMMSP, 710 pp. ISBN 978-0-9701684-5-0 (e-book); ISBN 978-0-9701684-8-1 (hard copy).
- 2013b. Troubles with Tonal Terminology. 32 pp. (under ongoing revision)
- 2014. Everyday Tonality II: towards a tonal theory of what most people hear (2nd edition). New York & Huddersfield: MMMSP, 600 pp. ISBN 978-0-9908068-0-6 (e-book).
