= Nicolas Ruwet =

French linguist and musical analyst (1932–2001)

- Born: 31 December 1932; Saive, Belgium
- Died: 15 November 2001 (aged 68); 12th arrondissement of Paris, Paris, France

Academic background
- Education: University of Liège; École pratique des hautes études; Massachusetts Institute of Technology

Academic work
- Discipline: Linguistics; Literary criticism; Musical analysis (Music semiology)
- Institutions: Paris 8 University Vincennes-Saint-Denis

Nicolas Ruwet (31 December 1932 – 15 November 2001) was a French linguist, literary critic and musical analyst of Belgian birth. He was involved with the development of generative grammar, and made important early contributions to music semiology.

== Life and career ==
Ruwet was born in Saive, Belgium on 31 December 1932. In his youth he studied music: discovering the then little-known music of Arnold Schoenberg and seeking a career as a composer. He initially studied Romance philology at the University of Liège. As he turned towards linguistics, he studied from 1959 onwards with Émile Benveniste, Claude Lévi-Strauss, and André Martinet in Paris. Later, he studied with Noam Chomsky and Roman Jakobson, both influences, at the Massachusetts Institute of Technology.

Ruwet is best known for his work as a linguist and critic, but he was also a significant figure in musical analysis. He attempted to make his analyses completely objective by not making any a priori assumptions about how the music worked, instead breaking the piece down into small parts and seeing how those parts related to each other, thus discovering the syntax of the piece without reference to any external sources or norms. His work in this field constitutes a kind of musical semiology and his analytical methods were later named paradigmatic analysis.

Grove Music Online notes that "Though not primarily a musicologist, he has been a fundamental thinker in the field of the Semiotics of music." Some of his musical analyses were published along with other works in Langage, musique, poésie [Language, Music, Poetry] (1972). Among his students was the musicologist Jean-Jacques Nattiez, himself a seminal music semiotician.

Ruwet died at the age 68 on November 14, 2001.

== Selected publications ==
- Ruwet, Nicolas (1967). Introduction à la Grammaire Générative [An Introduction to Generative Grammar] (in French). Paris: Plon.
- —— (1973). An Introduction to Generative Grammar. North-Holland Linguistic Series. Translated by Norval S.H., Smith. Amsterdam: North Holland. ISBN 978-0-7204-6187-9.
- —— (1972). Langage, musique, poésie (in French). Paris: Éditions du Seuil.
- —— (1991). Syntax and Human Experience. Studies in Contemporary Linguistics. Translated by Goldsmith, John. Chicago: The University of Chicago Press. ISBN 978-0-226-73221-3.
