= Sign (semiotics) =

Something that communicates meaning

In semiotics, a sign is anything that communicates a meaning that is not the sign itself to the interpreter of the sign. The meaning can be intentional, as when a word is uttered with a specific meaning, or unintentional, as when a symptom is taken as a sign of a particular medical condition. Signs can communicate through any of the senses, visual, auditory, tactile, olfactory, or taste.

Two major theories describe the way signs acquire the ability to transfer information. Both theories understand the defining property of the sign as a relation between a number of elements. In semiology, the tradition of semiotics developed by Ferdinand de Saussure (1857–1913), the sign relation is dyadic, consisting only of a form of the sign (the signifier) and the recipients cultural knowledge of the signifier (the signified). Only through the connection of the two is meaning made. Saussure saw this relation as being essentially arbitrary (the principle of semiotic arbitrariness), motivated only by social convention. Saussure's theory has been particularly influential in the study of linguistic signs. The other major semiotic theory, developed by Charles Sanders Peirce (1839–1914), defines the sign as a triadic relation as "something which stands to somebody for something in some respect or capacity.” This means that a sign is a relation between the sign vehicle (the specific physical form of the sign), a sign object (the aspect of the world that the sign carries meaning about) and an interpretant (the meaning of the sign as understood by an interpreter). According to Peirce, signs can be divided by the type of relation that holds the sign relation together as either icons, indices or symbols. Icons are those signs that signify by means of similarity between sign vehicle and sign object (e.g. a portrait or map), indices are those that signify by means of a direct relation of contiguity or causality between sign vehicle and sign object (e.g. a symptom), and symbols are those that signify through a law or arbitrary social convention.

== Dyadic signs ==
According to Ferdinand de Saussure (1857–1913), a sign is composed of the signifier (signifiant), and the signified (signifié). These cannot be conceptualized as separate entities but rather as a mapping from significant differences in sound to potential (correct) differential denotation. The Saussurean sign exists only at the level of the synchronic system, in which signs are defined by their relative and hierarchical privileges of co-occurrence. It is thus a common misreading of Saussure to take signifiers to be anything one could speak, and signifieds as things in the world. In fact, the relationship of language to parole (or speech-in-context) is and always has been a theoretical problem for linguistics (cf. Roman Jakobson's famous essay "Closing Statement: Linguistics and Poetics" et al.).

A famous thesis by Saussure states that the relationship between a sign and the real-world thing it denotes is an arbitrary one. There is not a natural relationship between a word and the object it refers to, nor is there a causal relationship between the inherent properties of the object and the nature of the sign used to denote it. For example, there is nothing about the physical quality of paper that requires denotation by the phonological sequence 'paper'. There is, however, what Saussure called 'relative motivation': the possibilities of signification of a signifier are constrained by the compositionality of elements in the linguistic system (cf. Émile Benveniste's paper on the arbitrariness of the sign in the first volume of his papers on general linguistics). In other words, a word is only available to acquire a new meaning if it is identifiably different from all the other words in the language and it has no existing meaning. Structuralism was later based on this idea that it is only within a given system that one can define the distinction between the levels of system and use, or the semantic "value" of a sign.

This claim of the "arbitrariness of the sign" has been called into question by research in sign languages, in which it appears to be a modality effect, found primarily in spoken languages, rather than a linguistic universal.

== Triadic signs ==
Charles Sanders Peirce (1839–1914) proposed a different theory. Unlike Saussure who approached the conceptual question from a study of linguistics and phonology, Peirce, considered the father of Pragmaticism, extended the concept of sign to embrace many other forms. He considered "word" to be only one particular kind of sign, and characterized sign as any mediational means to understanding. He covered not only artificial, linguistic and symbolic signs, but also all semblances (such as kindred sensible qualities), and all indicators (such as mechanical reactions). He counted as symbols all terms, propositions and arguments whose interpretation is based upon convention or habit, even apart from their expression in particular languages. He held that "all this universe is perfused with signs, if it is not composed exclusively of signs". The setting of Peirce's study of signs is philosophical logic, which he defined as formal semiotic, and characterized as a normative field following esthetics and ethics, as more basic than metaphysics, and as the art of devising methods of research. He argued that, since all thought takes time, all thought is in signs, that all thought has the form of inference (even when not conscious and deliberate), and that, as inference, "logic is rooted in the social principle", since inference depends on a standpoint that, in a sense, is unlimited. The result is a theory not of language in particular, but rather of the production of meaning, and it rejects the idea of a static relationship between a sign and what it represents: its object. Peirce believed that signs are meaningful through recursive relationships that arise in sets of three.

Even when a sign represents by a resemblance or factual connection independent of interpretation, the sign is a sign only insofar as it is at least potentially interpretable by a mind and insofar as the sign is a determination of a mind or at least a quasi-mind, that functions as if it were a mind, for example in crystals and the work of bees—the focus here is on sign action in general, not on psychology, linguistics, or social studies (fields Peirce also pursued).

A sign depends on an object in a way that enables (and, in a sense, determines) an interpretation, an interpretant, to depend on the object as the sign depends on the object. The interpretant, then, is a further sign of the object, and thus enables and determines still further interpretations, further interpretant signs. The process, called semiosis, is irreducibly triadic, Peirce held, and is logically structured to perpetuate itself. It is what defines sign, object and interpretant in general. As Jean-Jacques Nattiez put it, "the process of referring effected by the sign is infinite." (Peirce used the word "determine" in the sense not of strict determinism, but of effectiveness that can vary like an influence.)

Peirce further characterized the three semiotic elements as follows:

1. Sign (or representamen): that which represents the denoted object (cf. Saussure's "signifier").
2. Object (or semiotic object): that which the sign represents (or as some put it, encodes). It can be anything thinkable, a law, a fact, or even a possibility (a semiotic object could even be fictional, such as Hamlet); those are partial objects; the total object is the universe of discourse, the totality of objects in that world to which one attributes the partial object. For example, perturbation of Neptune's orbit is a sign about Pluto, but not only about Pluto. The object may be
  1. immediate to the sign, the object as represented in the sign, or
  2. dynamic, the object as it really is, on which the immediate object is founded.
3. Interpretant (or interpretant sign): a sign's meaning or ramification as formed into a further sign by interpreting (or, as some put it, decoding) the sign. The interpretant may be:
  1. immediate to the sign, a kind of possibility, all that the sign is suited to immediately express, for instance a word's usual meaning;
  2. dynamic, that is, the meaning as formed into an actual effect, for example an individual translation or a state of agitation, or
  3. final or normal, that is, the ultimate meaning that inquiry taken far enough would be destined to reach. It is a kind of norm or ideal end, with which an actual interpretant may, at most, coincide.

Peirce explained that signs mediate between their objects and their interpretants in semiosis, the triadic process of determination. In semiosis a first is determined or influenced to be a sign by a second, as its object. The object determines the sign to determine a third as an interpretant. Firstness itself is one of Peirce's three categories of all phenomena, and is quality of feeling. Firstness is associated with a vague state of mind as feeling and a sense of the possibilities, with neither compulsion nor reflection. In semiosis the mind discerns an appearance or phenomenon, a potential sign. Secondness is reaction or resistance, a category associated with moving from possibility to determinate actuality. Here, through experience outside of and collateral to the given sign or sign system, one recalls or discovers the object the sign refers to, for example when a sign consists in a chance semblance of an absent but remembered object. It is through one's collateral experience that the object determines the sign to determine an interpretant. Thirdness is representation or mediation, the category associated with signs, generality, rule, continuity, habit-taking and purpose. Here one forms an interpretant expressing a meaning or ramification of the sign about the object. When a second sign is considered, the initial interpretant may be confirmed, or new possible meanings may be identified. As each new sign is addressed, more interpretants, themselves signs, emerge. It can involve a mind's reading of nature, people, mathematics, anything.

Peirce generalized the communicational idea of utterance and interpretation of a sign, to cover all signs:

Admitting that connected Signs must have a Quasi-mind, it may further be declared that there can be no isolated sign. Moreover, signs require at least two Quasi-minds; a Quasi-utterer and a Quasi-interpreter; and although these two are at one (i.e., are one mind) in the sign itself, they must nevertheless be distinct. In the Sign they are, so to say, welded. Accordingly, it is not merely a fact of human Psychology, but a necessity of Logic, that every logical evolution of thought should be dialogic.

According to Nattiez, writing with Jean Molino, the tripartite definition of sign, object and interpretant is based on the "trace" or neutral level, Saussure's "sound-image" (or "signified", thus Peirce's "representamen"). Thus, "a symbolic form...is not some 'intermediary' in a process of 'communication' that transmits the meaning intended by the author to the audience; it is instead the result of a complex process of creation (the poietic process) that has to do with the form as well as the content of the work; it is also the point of departure for a complex process of reception (the esthesic process that reconstructs a 'message'").

Molino's and Nattiez's diagram:

Poietic Process			Esthesic Process
"Producer"	→	Trace	←	Receiver

Peirce's theory of the sign therefore offered a powerful analysis of the signification system, its codes, and its processes of inference and learning—because the focus was often on natural or cultural context rather than linguistics, which only analyses usage in slow time whereas human semiotic interaction in the real world often has a chaotic blur of language and signal exchange. Nevertheless, the implication that triadic relations are structured to perpetuate themselves leads to a level of complexity not usually experienced in the routine of message creation and interpretation. Hence, different ways of expressing the idea have developed.

=== Classes of triadic signs ===
By 1903, Peirce came to classify signs by three universal trichotomies dependent on his three categories (quality, fact, habit). He classified any sign:

1. by what stands as the sign—either (qualisign, also called a tone) a quality—or (sinsign, also called token) an individual fact—or (legisign, also called type) a rule, a habit;
2. by how the sign stands for its object—either (icon) by its own quality, such that it resembles the object, regardless of factual connection and of interpretive rule of reference—or (index) by factual connection to its object, regardless of resemblance and of interpretive rule of reference—or (symbol) by rule or habit of interpreted reference to its object, regardless of resemblance and of factual connection; and
3. by how the sign stands for its object to its interpretant—either (rheme, also called seme, such as a term) as regards quality or possibility, as if the sign were a qualisign, though it can be qualisign, sinsign, or legisign—or (dicisign, also called pheme, such as a proposition) as regards fact, as if the sign were an index, though it can be index or symbol—or (argument, also called delome) as regards rule or habit. This is the trichotomy of all signs as building blocks in an inference process.
- Any qualisign is an icon. Sinsigns include some icons and some indices. Legisigns include some icons, some indices and all symbols.
- Any icon is a rheme. Indices (be they sinsigns or legisigns) include some rhemes and some dicisigns. Symbols include some rhemes, some dicisigns and all arguments.

Lines of joint classification of signs. Every sign is:
	1.		2.		3.
I.	Qualisign	or	Sinsign	or	Legisign
and
II.	Icon	or	Index	or	Symbol
and
III.	Rheme	or	Dicisign	or	Argument

Because of those classificatory interdependences, the three trichotomies intersect to form ten (rather than 27) classes of signs. There are also various kinds of meaningful combination. Signs can be attached to one another. A photograph is an index with a meaningfully attached icon. Arguments are composed of dicisigns, and dicisigns are composed of rhemes. In order to be embodied, legisigns (types) need sinsigns (tokens) as their individual replicas or instances. A symbol depends as a sign on how it will be interpreted, regardless of resemblance or factual connection to its object; but the symbol's individual embodiment is an index to your experience of the object. A symbol is instanced by a specialized indexical sinsign. A symbol such as a sentence in a language prescribes qualities of appearance for its instances, and is itself a replica of a symbol such as a proposition apart from expression in a particular language. Peirce covered both semantic and syntactical issues in his theoretical grammar, as he sometimes called it. He regarded formal semiotic, as logic, as furthermore encompassing study of arguments (hypothetical, deductive and inductive) and inquiry's methods including pragmatism; and as allied to but distinct from logic's pure mathematics.

Peirce sometimes referred to the ground of a sign. The ground is the pure abstraction of a quality. A sign's ground is the respect in which the sign represents its object, e.g. as in literal and figurative language. For example, an icon presents a characteristic or quality attributed to an object, while a symbol imputes to an object a quality either presented by an icon or symbolized so as to evoke a mental icon.

Peirce called an icon apart from a label, legend, or other index attached to it, a "hypoicon", and divided the hypoicon into three classes: (a) the image, which depends on a simple quality; (b) the diagram, whose internal relations, mainly dyadic or so taken, represent by analogy the relations in something; and (c) the metaphor, which represents the representative character of a sign by representing a parallelism in something else. A diagram can be geometric, or can consist in an array of algebraic expressions, or even in the common form "All __ is ___" which is subjectable, like any diagram, to logical or mathematical transformations. Peirce held that mathematics is done by diagrammatic thinking—observation of, and experimentation on, diagrams. Peirce developed for deductive logic a system of visual existential graphs, which continue to be researched today.

== 20th-century theories ==
It is now agreed that the effectiveness of the acts that may convert the message into text (including speaking, writing, drawing, music and physical movements) depends upon the knowledge of the sender. If the sender is not familiar with the current language, its codes and its culture, then they will not be able to say anything at all, whether as a visitor in a different language area or because of a medical condition such as aphasia.

Modern theories deny the Saussurian distinction between signifier and signified, and look for meaning not in the individual signs, but in their context and the framework of potential meanings that could be applied. Such theories assert that language is a collective memory or cultural history of all the different ways in which meaning has been communicated, and may to that extent, constitute all life's experiences (see Louis Hjelmslev). Hjelmslev did not consider the sign to be the smallest semiotic unit, as he believed it possible to decompose it further; instead, he considered the "internal structure of language" to be a system of figurae, a concept somewhat related to that of figure of speech, which he considered to be the ultimate semiotic unit.

This position implies that speaking is simply one more form of behaviour and changes the focus of attention from the text as language, to the text as a representation of purpose, a functional version of authorial intent. But, once the message has been transmitted, the text exists independently.

Hence, although the writers who co-operated to produce this page exist, they can only be represented by the signs actually selected and presented here. The interpretation process in the receiver's mind may attribute meanings completely different from those intended by the senders. But, why might this happen? Neither the sender nor the receiver of a text has a perfect grasp of all language. Each individual's relatively small stock of knowledge is the product of personal experience and their attitude to learning. When the audience receives the message, there will always be an excess of connotations available to be applied to the particular signs in their context (no matter how relatively complete or incomplete their knowledge, the cognitive process is the same).

The first stage in understanding the message is therefore, to suspend or defer judgement until more information becomes available. At some point, the individual receiver decides which of all possible meanings represents the best possible fit. Sometimes, uncertainty may not be resolved, so meaning is indefinitely deferred, or a provisional or approximate meaning is allocated. More often, the receiver's desire for closure (see Gestalt psychology) leads to simple meanings being attributed out of prejudices and without reference to the sender's intentions.

== Postmodern theory ==
In critical theory, the notion of sign is used variously. As Daniel Chandler has said:

Many postmodernist theorists postulate a complete disconnection of the signifier and the signified. An 'empty' or 'floating signifier' is variously defined as a signifier with a vague, highly variable, unspecifiable or non-existent signified. Such signifiers mean different things to different people: they may stand for many or even any signifieds; they may mean whatever their interpreters want them to mean.

== See also ==
- Grapheme
- Indexicality
- Triangle of reference
- Sign relation
- Freudian slip
