= Raymond Monelle =

British music theorist and musician

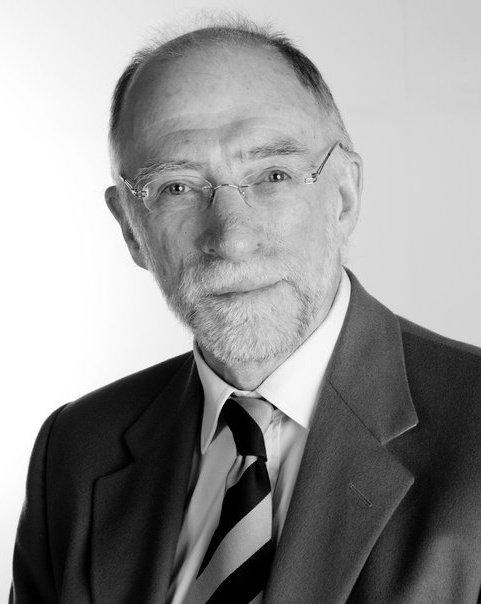
Raymond Monelle

Raymond Monelle (19 August 1937 in Bristol, England – 12 March 2010 in Edinburgh, Scotland) was a music theorist, teacher, music critic, composer and jazz pianist. Monelle wrote three books, dozens of articles on music, and many music criticism reviews in newspapers, mainly for Opera and The Independent. His main field of research was music signification or, as it is also known, music semiotics. Towards the end of his life, he wrote a novel, yet to be published, entitled Bird in the Apple Tree, about the adolescence of the composer Alban Berg.

== Education ==
Monelle received a Master of Arts degree in modern history from the University of Oxford and Bachelor of Music degree from the University of London. A member of the Royal Musical Association at least since 1968, he completed his Ph.D. at the University of Edinburgh with a doctoral thesis on "Opera seria as drama: the musical dramas of Hasse and Metastasio", which he wrote under the supervision of David Kimbell.

== Scholarship ==
Monelle was renowned for his research in the field of music signification (the semiotics of music). His three books, many articles and countless lectures, presented in various venues all over Europe, North America and Israel, had an immense impact on the international music scholarship scene. In 1988 he joined the Music Signification Project, founded by Eero Tarasti two years earlier, and became one of the project's leaders, acting as keynote speaker and editor of proceedings in all the International Congresses of Music Signification that followed.

His publications touch a wide variety of subjects and musical styles, but focus mainly on two subjects: the analysis of music as text and The Musical Topic. In the first subject, Monelle was strongly influenced by Derrida's writings on deconstruction. On the second subject, he presented a research into the topics of the military. Toward the end of his life, he began studying the subject of The Musical Sublime, inspired by the writings of Slavoj Žižek.

== Teaching activities ==
Monelle joined the Faculty of Music at the University of Edinburgh in 1969 serving throughout the 1970s as conductor of the university society choir and opera club, and teaching History, Counterpoint, Harmony, Analysis, and the Semiotics of Music. Most famous classes were his "Wagner Project Weeks" in which he took students for a week away from Edinburgh to Holy Island, off the coast of Northumberland, for a week of listening and study of Richard Wagner's Der Ring des Nibelungen. He was granted the title of a Reader in 1992(?) and full professorship in 2002(?) the year in which he retired from the university of Edinburgh. After his retirement he continued to teach theory and counterpoint at Napier University in Edinburgh.

== Composition and performance ==
Monelle composed several works: among them works for piano and for organ, choir arrangements of Christmas Carols and a Mass setting for choir and orchestra, which he later adapted for choir and organ for the choir of Old St Paul's, Edinburgh. He did some conducting, mainly of choral and opera productions, and was particularly known for his skilled jazz piano playing. He also nurtured the careers of two of Scotland's most notable living musicians, Donald Runnicles and James MacMillan.

== Publications ==
=== Books ===
- Monelle, Raymond (1992). Linguistics and Semiotics in Music. Harwood Academic Publishers.
- Monelle, Raymond (2000). The Sense of Music: Semiotic Essays. Princeton University Press.
- Monelle, Raymond (2006). The musical topic: hunt, military, and pastoral. Indiana University Press.

=== Editions ===
- Monelle, Raymond; Gray, Catherine T., eds. (1995). Song and Signification: Studies in Music Semiotics. University of Edinburgh, Faculty of Music.
- Musica Significans: 1998, Proceedings of the Third International Conference on Musical Signification, Edinburgh.

=== Articles ===
- Monelle, Raymond (1968). "Notes on Bartók's Fourth Quartet". The Music Review. 29 (2): 123–129.
- Monelle, Raymond (July 1984). "Word-Setting in the Strophic Lied". Music & Letters. 65 (3): 229–236. doi:10.1093/ml/65.3.229.
- Monelle, Raymond (July 1990). "Tovey's Marginalia". The Musical Times. 131 (1769): 351–354. doi:10.2307/965745. JSTOR 965745.
- Monelle, Raymond (June 1991). "Music and the Peircean Trichotomies". International Review of the Aesthetics and Sociology of Music. 22 (1): 99–108. doi:10.2307/837037. JSTOR 837037.
- Monelle, Raymond (March 1991). "Structural Semantics and Instrumental Music". Music Analysis. 10 (1, 2): 73–88. doi:10.2307/853999. JSTOR 853999.
- Monelle, Raymond (1992). "A semantic approach to Debussy's songs". The Music Review. 51 (3): 193–207.
- Monelle, Raymond (1995). "An Allegory of Ars Antiqua: Peter Maxwell Davies's Antechrist". In Jablonski, Maciej; Steszewski, Jan (eds.). Interdisciplinary studies in musicology : report from the Third Interdisciplinary Conference.
- Monelle, Raymond (1995). "Music and Semantics". In Tarasti, Eero (ed.). Musical Signification: Essays in the Semiotic Theory and Analysis of Music. Berlin: Mouton.
- Monelle, Raymond (1996). "The postmodern project in music theory". In Tarasti, Eero (ed.). Musical Semiotics in Growth. Bloomington, Indiana: Indiana University Press, International Semiotics Institute, Imatra.
- Monelle, Raymond (1996). "What is a musical text?". In Tarasi, Eero (ed.). Musical Semiotics in Growth. Bloomington, Indiana: Indiana University Press, International Semiotics Institute, Imatra.
- Monelle, Raymond (1997). "Musical uniqueness as a function of the text". Applied Semiotics/Sémiotique appliquée. 2 (4): 49–68.
- Monelle, Raymond (1997). "Literary thematics and musical topics". In Jablonski, Maciej; Steszewski, Jan (eds.). Interdisciplinary studies in musicology: report from the Third Interdisciplinary Conference.
- Monelle, Raymond (1997). "BWV 886 as allegory of listening". In Monelle, R. (ed.). Musica Significans: Proceedings of the Third International Congress on Musical Signification, Edinburgh, 1992. Amsterdam: Harwood. (also published in the Contemporary Music Review, 16(4), 1997, pp. 79–88
- Monelle, Raymond (1997). "Binary semantic opposition in Debussy". In Rauch, Irmengard; Carr, Gerald F. (eds.). Semiotics around the World: synthesis in diversity. Berlin: Mouton de Gruyter. pp. 647–650.
- "Scottish music, real and spurious". in T. Mäkelä (ed.) Music and nationalism in 20th-century Great Britain and Finland. Hamburg: von Bockel, 1997, pp. 87–110
- "The temporal index." In Musical signification, between rhetoric and pragmatics. Ed. G. Stefani, E. Tarasti & L. Marconi. Bologna: CLUEB, 1998, pp. 95–102
- "Real and virtual time in Bach's keyboard suites". In Ernest W.B Hess-Lüttich & Brigitte Schlieben-Lange (eds.) Signs & time/Zeit & Zeichen.Tübingen: Gunter Narr, 1998, pp. 13–24
- "Music's transparency." In Les universaux en musique. Ed. C. Miereanu & X. Hascher. Paris: Sorbonne, 1998, pp. 11–30
- "The indexical science". in Ioannis Zannos (ed.) Music and signs: semiotic and cognitive studies in music. Berlin: Staatliches Institut für Musikforschung Preußischer Kulturbesitz, and Bratislava: ASCO Art and Science, 1999, pp. 331–438
- "Temporality and nature in Romantic music". in Adrian Gimate-Welsh (ed.) La semiótica: intersección entre la naturaleza y la cultura. CD Rom. México, D.F.: Universidad Autónoma Metropolitana de México, 1999. 8 pp., MUSICAL 11.pdf
- "Theory and humanist criticism". Semiotica 131 – 3/4, 2000, 403—414
- "Horn and trumpet as topical signifiers". Historic Brass Society Journal 13, 2001, pp. 102–117
- "The criticism of musical performance". in Musical performance, a guide to understanding, ed. John Rink, Cambridge : Cambridge University Press, 2002, pp. 213–224 (Also published in Spanish: "La crítica de la interpretación musical", in La interpretación musical, ed. John Rink, trans. Barbara Zitman: Madrid, Alianza Editorial, 2006, pp. 249–261.)
- "Die gegenseitige Metaphorisierung der Klänge in der Musik". Zeitschrift für Semiotik (Germany) 25/1–2, 2003, pp. 125–140
- "Musical uniqueness as a function of the text". in Applied Semiotics/Sémiotique appliquée, ed. Pascal G. Michelucci & Peter G. Marteinson; no. 4: 'Semiotics of Music/Sémiotique musicale', University of Toronto, 2005, pp. 49–68
- "Semiotics threatens no one . . ." in Music and the Arts, proceedings from ICMS 7, ed. E. Tarasti, P. Forsell and R. Littlefield. Acta Semiotica Fennica XXIII; Approaches to Musical Semiotics 10. Helsinki: Semiotic Society of Finland, 2006, pp. 31–44
- "Narrative as polychronic synthesis." in Music and the Arts, proceedings from ICMS 7, ed. E. Tarasti, P. Forsell and R. Littlefield. Acta Semiotica Fennica XXIII; Approaches to Musical Semiotics 10. Helsinki: Semiotic Society of Finland, 2006, pp. 76–82
- "Mahler's military gesture: musical quotation as proto-topic". in Musical Gesture, ed. Anthony Gritten and Elaine King, Aldershot, Ashgate, 2006, pp. 91–103
- "Life and death in a fugue of Bach" in Music and its questions : essays in honor of Peter Williams. 2007, Thomas Donahue Press.
- "The Absent Meaning of Music" unpublished paper, presented at the 10th ICMS, Vilnius, October 2008

=== Compositions (selection) ===
- Arrangements of Carols:
  - "Tell us, thou cleere and heaven'ly tongue, Where is the Babe but lately spring" combining a poem from Herrick's Noble Numbers with a lute piece by Dowland: "Captain Digorie Piper's Galliard" from the First Book of Ayers, for soprano solo, SSA choir and piano (published by Boosey and Hawkes, 1972).
  - "Nowell sing we, both all and some" SSA choir and piano, melody taken from the Selden MS-Nowell. (Published by Boosey and Hawkes, 1972)
- Missa Ce fu en Mai a mass for choir, organ, and strings.
- Missa Brevis an adaptation of the former for choir and organ written for the choir of Old St Paul's who sang it at his requiem mass under the direction of his colleague and friend Dr John Kitchen.
- Ballatis of Luve
- Organ works
- Piano works
