= Repetition (music) =

In music, the repeated use of a sound or sequence

Repeat sign

Repetition is important in music, where sounds or sequences are often repeated. It may be called restatement, such as the restatement of a theme. While it plays a role in all music, with noise and musical tones lying along a spectrum from irregular to periodic sounds, it is especially prominent in specific styles.

Motivic repetition in Beethoven's Sonata in F major, Op. 10, no. 2

== Usage ==
A literal repetition of a musical passage is often indicated by the use of a repeat sign, or the instructions da capo or dal segno.

Repetition is a part and parcel of symmetry—and of establishing motifs and hooks. You find a melodic or rhythmic figure that you like, and you repeat it throughout the course of the melody or song. This sort of repetition...helps to unify your melody; it's the melodic equivalent of a steady drumbeat, and serves as an identifying factor for listeners. However, too much of a good thing can get annoying. If you repeat your figure too often, it will start to bore the listener.

— (Miller, 106)

Memory affects the music-listening experience so profoundly that it would not be hyperbole to say that without memory there would be no music. As scores of theorists and philosophers have noted...music is based on repetition. Music works because we remember the tones we have just heard and are relating them to the ones that are just now being played. Those groups of tones—phrases—might come up later in the piece in a variation or transposition that tickles our memory system at the same time as it activates our emotional centers...(Levitin, 162–163)

Repeat sign with first and second endings

Theodor W. Adorno damned repetition and popular music as psychotic and infantile. In contrast, Richard Middleton (1990) argues that "while repetition is a feature of all music, of any sort, a high level of repetition may be a specific mark of 'the popular'" and that this allows an "enabling" of "an inclusive rather than exclusive audience". "There is no universal norm or convention" for the amount or type of repetition; "all music contains repetition – but in differing amounts and of an enormous variety of types". This is influenced by "the political economy of production; the 'psychic economy' of individuals; the musico-technological media of production and reproduction (oral, written, electric); and the weight of the syntactic conventions of music-historical traditions".

Middleton distinguishes between discursive and musematic repetition. A museme is a minimal unit of meaning, analogous to a morpheme in linguistics, and musematic repetition is "at the level of the short figure, often used to generate an entire structural framework". Discursive repetition is "at the level of the phrase or section, which generally functions as part of a larger-scale 'argument'". He gives "paradigmatic case[s]": the riff and the phrase. Musematic repetition includes circularity, synchronic relations, and openness. Discursive repetition includes linearity, rational control, and self-sufficiency. Discursive repetition is most often nested (hierarchically) in larger repetitions and may be thought of as sectional, while musematic repetition may be thought of as additive. Put more simply, musematic repetition is simple repetition of precisely the same musical figure, such as a repeated chorus. Discursive repetition is "both repetitive and non-repetitive" (Lott, p. 174), such as the repetition of the same rhythmic figure with different notes.

During the Classical era, musical concerts were highly expected events, and because someone who liked a piece of music could not listen to it again, musicians had to think of a way to make the music sink in. Therefore, they would repeat parts of their song at times, making music like sonatas very repetitive, without being dull.

Repetition is important in musical form. The repetition of any section of ternary form results in expanded ternary form, and in binary form the repetition of the first section at the end of the second results in rounded binary form. Schenker argued that musical technique's "most striking and distinctive characteristic" is repetition (Kivy, 327) while Boulez argues that a high level of interest in repetition and variation (analogy and difference, recognition and the unknown) is characteristic of all musicians, especially contemporary, and the dialectic between the two creates musical form (Campbell, 154).

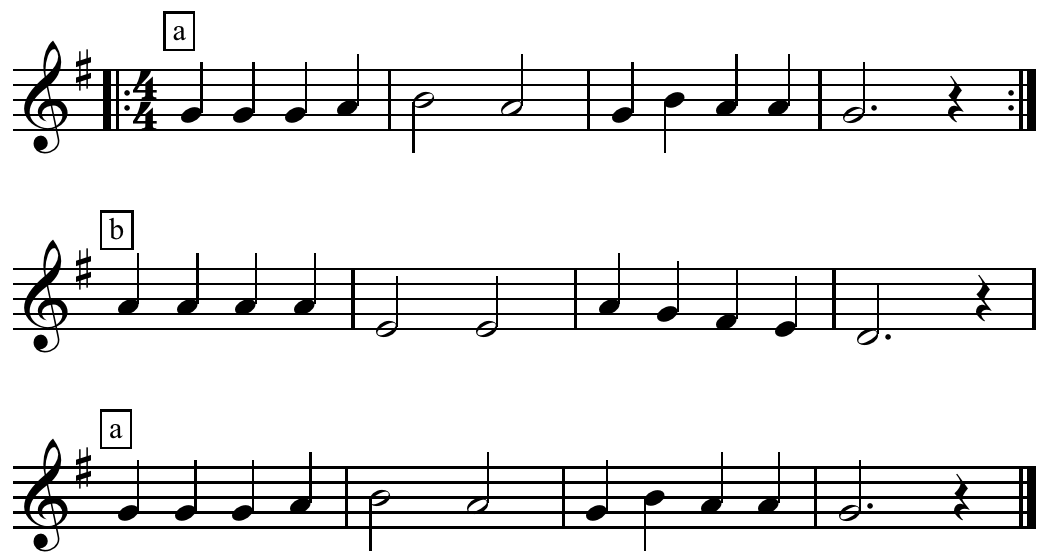
"Au clair de la lune", repetition after digression.(Copland & Slatkin)

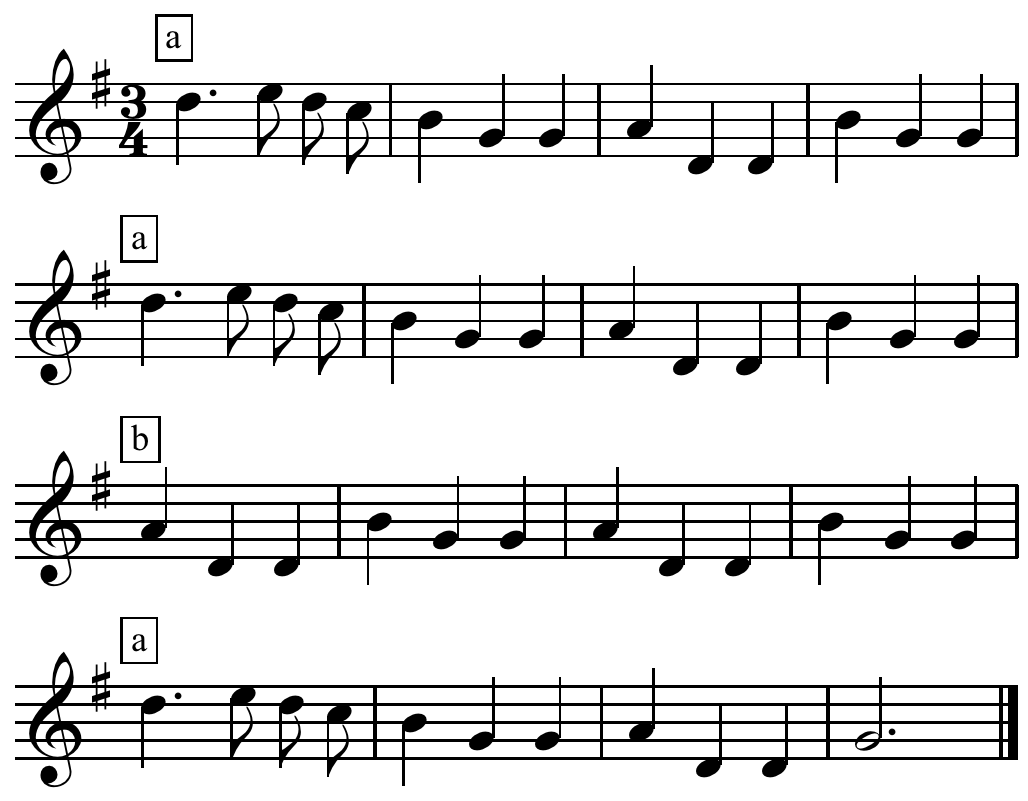
"Ach! du lieber Augustin", repetition after digression.(Copland & Slatkin)

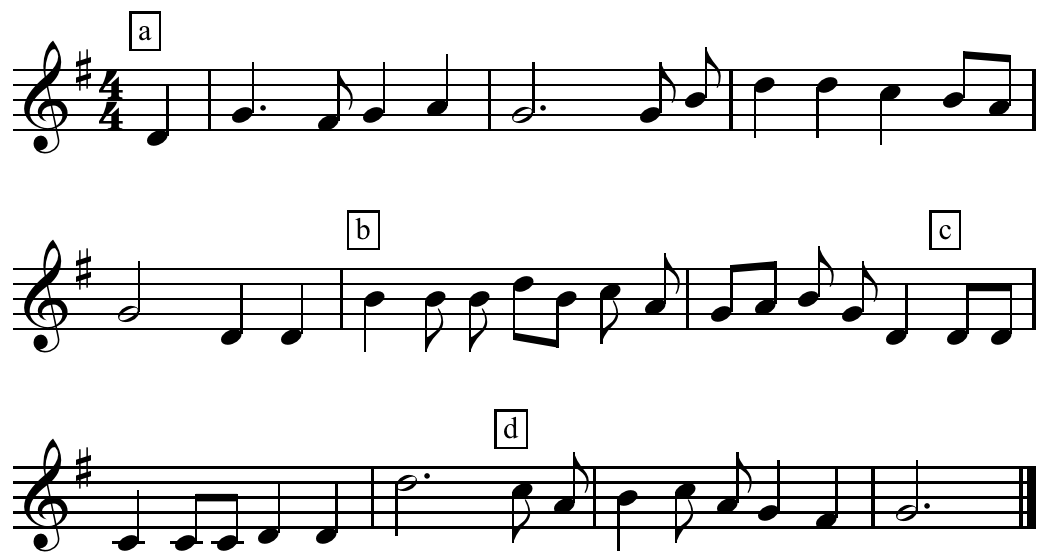
"The Seeds of Love" (English folk song), nonrepetition.(Copland & Slatkin)

Types of repetition include "exact repetition" (aaa), "repetition after digression" (aba or aba'), and "nonrepetition" (abcd). Copland and Slatkin offer "Au clair de la lune" and "Ach! du lieber Augustin" as examples of aba, and "The Seeds of Love" as an example of the last.(Copland & Slatkin, ^{[unpaginated]})

At the tone level, repetition creates a drone.

== Repetitive music ==
Some music features a relatively high degree of repetition in its creation or reception. Examples include minimalist music, krautrock, disco (and its later derivatives such as house music), some techno, some of Igor Stravinsky's compositions, barococo, and the Suzuki method (Fink 2005, p. 5).

Other important genres with repetitive songwriting are post rock, ambient/dark ambient, and black metal.

=== Psychological interpretations ===
Repetitive music has often been negatively linked with Freudian thanatos. Theodor W. Adorno provides an example in his criticism of Igor Stravinsky, whose "rhythmic procedures closely resemble the schema of catatonic conditions. In certain schizophrenics, the process by which the motor apparatus becomes independent leads to infinite repetition of gestures or words, following the decay of the ego." Similar criticism was leveled at Ravel's Bolero.

Wim Mertens (1980, pp. 123–124) writes, "In repetitive music, repetition in the service of the death instinct prevails. Repetition is not repetition of identical elements, so it is not reproduction, but the repetition of the identical in another guise. In traditional music, repetition is a device for creating recognizability, reproduction for the sake of the music notes of that specific line and the representing ego. In repetitive music, repetition does not refer to eros and the ego, but to the libido and to the death instinct."

Repetitive music has also been linked with Lacanian jouissance. David Schawrz (1992, p. 134) argues that the repetition in John Adams's Nixon in China is "trapping listeners in a narrow acoustic corridor of the Real" while Naomi Cumming (1997, p. 129–152) argues that the repetitive string ostinatos of Steve Reich's Different Trains are "prearticulate" pieces of the Real providing a refuge from the Holocaust and its "horror of identification".

=== Genres ===
DJs at disco clubs in the 1970s played a smooth mix of long single disco records to keep people dancing all night long. The 12-inch single was popularized as a means to this end. While disco songs have some repetitive elements, such as a persistent throbbing beat, these are counterbalanced by the musical variety provided by orchestral arrangements and disco mixes that add different sound textures to the music, ranging from a full, orchestral sound to stripped-down break sections.

The electronic dance music genres that followed disco in the 1980s and 1990s, such as house music and techno, kept disco's bass drum rhythm but discarded orchestral arrangements and horn sections. House and techno had a more minimalist sound that layered electronic sounds and samples over a drum machine and a repetitive synth bassline.

Extremely repetitive song structures are also used by some black metal bands like Burzum, Darkthrone, Forgotten Woods, Lustre and Striborg.

== See also ==
- Cycle (music)
- Groove (music)
- Imitation (music)
- Melodic pattern
- Ostinato
- Paradigmatic analysis
- Drone music
- Refrain
- Repeat sign
- Reprise
- Sequence (music)
- Abbreviation (music)
- Recapitulation (music)

== Bibliography ==
- Adorno, Theodor W. (1973) [1948]. The Philosophy of Modern Music. Translated by Anne G. Mitchell; Wesley V. Blomster. Cited in Fink 2005.
- Benward & Saker (2003). Music: In Theory and Practice, Vol. I. Seventh edition. ISBN 978-0-07-294262-0.
- Bowen, Nathan. "Double Expositions and the use of repetition in Classical Music". Nathan Bowen's Blog. Blog Archive. Archived from the original on 21 March 2012.
- Campbell, Edward (2010). Boulez, Music and Philosophy. ISBN 978-0-521-86242-4. Cites Boulez 2005b, 156 and 239.
- Copland, Aaron & Slatkin, Leonard (2011). What to Listen for in Music. ISBN 978-1-101-51314-9.
- Cumming, Naomi (1997). "The Horrors of Identification: Reich's Different Trains" Perspectives of New Music 35, no. I (Winter).
- Fink, Robert (2005). Repeating Ourselves: American Minimal Music as Cultural Practice. ISBN 0-520-24550-4.
- Kivy, Peter (1993). The Fine Art of Repetition: Essays in the Philosophy of Music. ISBN 978-0-521-43598-7.
- Levitin, Daniel J. (2007). This Is Your Brain on Music: The Science of a Human Obsession. ISBN 978-0-452-28852-2.
- Lott, Eric (1993). Love and Theft: Blackface Minstrelsy and the American Working Class. Oxford University Press. ISBN 0-19-509641-X. Cited in Middleton.
- Margulis, Elizabeth Hellmuth (2013). On Repeat: How Music Plays the Mind. Oxford University Press. ISBN 978-0199990825.
- Mertens, Wim (1980/1983/1988). American Minimal Music, trans. J. Hautekiet. ISBN 0-912483-15-6. Cited in Fink 2005.
- Middleton, Richard (1990/2002). Studying Popular Music. Philadelphia: Open University Press. ISBN 0-335-15275-9.
- Middleton, Richard (1999). "Form". Key Terms in Popular Music and Culture, Horner, Bruce and Swiss, Thomas, eds. Malden, Massachusetts. ISBN 0-631-21263-9.
- Miller, Michael (2005). The Complete Idiot's Guide to Music Theory. ISBN 978-1-59257-437-7.
- Moravcsik, Michael J. (2001). Musical Sound: An Introduction to the Physics of Music. ISBN 978-0-306-46710-3.
- Jonas, Oswald (1982). Introduction to the Theory of Heinrich Schenker (1934: Das Wesen des musikalischen Kunstwerks: Eine Einführung in Die Lehre Heinrich Schenkers). Translator:. John Rothgeb. ISBN 0-582-28227-6.
- Rajagopal, K. (2007). Engineering Physics. ISBN 978-81-203-3286-7.
- Schwarz, David (1992). "Postmodernism, the Subject, and the Real in John Adams's Nixon in China" Indiana Theory Review 13, no. 2 (fall). Cited in Fink 2005.
