= DeKoven =

Well-known individuals whose surname is or was DeKoven (or De Koven) include:

- Anna de Koven, American novelist, historian and socialite
- Bernie DeKoven, American game designer and author
- Jean de Koven, American dancer
- Lindy DeKoven, American television executive
- James DeKoven, American priest, educator, and a leader of the Oxford Movement in the Episcopal Church
- Reginald De Koven, American music critic and composer
- Seymour DeKoven, classical music radio personality

== Other uses ==
- Dekoven, Kentucky
