= Museme =

Basic unit of musical expression

A museme is a minimal unit of musical meaning, analogous to a morpheme in linguistics, "the basic unit of musical expression which in the framework of one given musical system is not further divisible without destruction of meaning." A museme may:

be broken down into component parts which are not in themselves meaningful within the framework of the musical language...but are nevertheless basic elements (not units) of musical expression which, when altered, may be compared to the phonemes of speech in that they alter the museme (morpheme) of which they are part and may thereby also alter its meaning.

The term was brought to popularity by Philip Tagg, derived from the work of Charles Seeger.

Musematic repetition ("repetition of musemes") is simple repetition "at the level of the short figure, often used to generate an entire structural framework." and contrasted with discursive repetition, in which the repetition is not so precise.

== See also ==
- Musical analysis
