= Music semiology =

Study of musical signs

Music semiology (semiotics) is the study of signs as they pertain to music on a variety of levels.

== Overview ==
Following Roman Jakobson, Kofi Agawu adopts the idea of musical semiosis being introversive or extroversive—that is, musical signs within a text and without. "Topics", or various musical conventions (such as horn calls, dance forms, and styles), have been treated suggestively by Agawu, among others. The notion of gesture is beginning to play a large role in musico-semiotic enquiry.

There are strong arguments that music inhabits a semiological realm which, on both ontogenetic and phylogenetic levels, has developmental priority over verbal language.

Writers on music semiology include Kofi Agawu (on topical theory, Schenkerian analysis), Robert S. Hatten (on topic, gesture), Raymond Monelle (on topic, musical meaning), Jean-Jacques Nattiez (on introversive taxonomic analysis and ethnomusicological applications), Anthony Newcomb (on narrativity), Thomas Turino (applying the semiotics of Charles Sanders Peirce), and Eero Tarasti (generally considered the founder of musical semiotics). Roland Barthes, himself a semiotician and skilled amateur pianist, wrote about music in some of the essays collected in Image, Music, Text and The Responsibility of Forms, as well as in the essay "Eiffel Tower", though he did not consider music to be a semiotic system.

Signs, meanings in music, happen essentially through the connotations of sounds, and through the social construction, appropriation and amplification of certain meanings associated with these connotations. The work of Philip Tagg (Ten Little Tunes, Fernando the Flute, Music’s Meanings) provides one of the most complete and systematic analysis of the relation between musical structures and connotations in western and especially popular, television and film music. The work of Leonard B. Meyer in Style and Music theorizes the relationship between ideologies and musical structures and the phenomena of style change, and focuses on Romanticism as a case study. Fred Lerdahl and Ray Jackendoff analyze how music is structured like a language with its own semiotics and syntax.

== See also ==
- Semiotics of music videos
