= Abbreviation (music) =

Abbreviations used in music notation

Abbreviations in music are of two kinds, namely, abbreviations of terms related to musical expression, and the true musical abbreviations by the help of which certain passages, chords, etc., may be notated in a shortened form, to the greater convenience of both composer and performer. Abbreviations of the first kind are like most abbreviations in language; they consist for the most part of the initial letter or first syllable of the word employed—as for instance, p or f for the dynamic markings piano and forte, cresc. for crescendo, Ob. for oboe, Fag. for bassoon (Italian: fagotto). This article is about abbreviations used in music notation.

== Repetition of a single note or chord ==
The continued repetition of a note or chord is expressed by a stroke or strokes across the stem, or above or below the note if it be a whole note or double whole note. The number of strokes denotes the subdivision of the written note into eighth notes, sixteenth notes, etc., unless the word tremolo or tremolando is added, in which case the repetition is as rapid as possible, without regard to the exact number of notes played. (When strokes are added to notes shorter than a quarter note, each beam counts as a stroke.) In the first bar of the example below, the half note with the single stroke across the stem in the written staff becomes 4 eighth notes in the played staff. Through the use of 2 strokes across the stem in the second bar, the next full note is expressed as a phrase of 16 sixteenth notes.

On bowed instruments the rapid reiteration of a single note is easy, but in piano music an octave or chord becomes necessary to produce a tremolo, the manner of writing and performing of which is seen below.

In the abbreviation expressed by strokes, as above, the passage to be abbreviated can contain no note of greater length than an eighth note, but it is possible also to divide a long note into quarter notes, by means of dots (sometimes known as divisi dots) placed over it, as below.

This is however seldom done, as only a small amount of space is saved. When a long note has to be repeated in the form of triplets or sextuplets, the figure 3 or 6 is usually placed over it in addition to the stroke across the stem, and the note is sometimes, though not necessarily, written dotted.

== Alternation of two notes ==
The repetition of a group of two notes is abbreviated by two notes (most often half notes or whole notes) connected by the number of strokes ordinarily used to express eighth notes, sixteenth notes, etc., according to the rate of movement intended, as below. It will be observed that a passage lasting for the value of one half note requires two half notes to express it, on account of the group consisting of two notes.

As seen above, half notes are often written with the strokes beaming the notes together (which is unambiguous as white notes with beams are not otherwise used in music), but with quarter notes and shorter the strokes must be separated from the stems to prevent them being misread as a shorter note value.

== Patterns of groups of three or more notes ==
A group of three, four, or more notes is abbreviated by the repetition of the cross strokes without the notes as many times as the group has to be repeated.

This can also be written with the notes forming the group are written as a chord, with the necessary number of strokes across the stem. In this case the word simili or segue is added, to show that the order of notes in the first group (which must be written out in full) is to be repeated, and to prevent the possibility of mistaking the effect intended for the repetition of the chord as a whole.

== Repetition marks ==
Another sign of abbreviation of a group consists of an oblique line with two dots, one on each side; this serves to indicate the repetition of a group of any number of notes of any length. This can even apply to a passage composed of several groups, provided such passage is not more than two bars in length.

A more usual method of abbreviating the repetition of a passage of the length of the above is to write over it the word bis (twice), or in some cases ter (three times), or to enclose it between the dots of an ordinary repeat sign.

== Passages in octaves ==
Passages intended to be played in octaves are often written as single notes with the words coll' ottava or coll' 8va placed above or below them, according as the upper or lower octave is to be added.

The word 8^{va} (or sometimes 8^{va} alta or 8^{va} bassa) written above or below a passage does not add octaves, but merely transposes the passage an octave higher or lower. In clarinet music the word chalumeau is used to signify that the passage is to be played an octave lower than written.

All these alterations (which can scarcely be considered abbreviations except that they spare the use of ledger lines) are counteracted, and the passage restored to its usual position, by the ending of the enclosing bracket, the word loco, or in clarinet music clarinette.

== Abbreviations in scores ==
In orchestral music it often happens that certain of the instruments play in unison; when this is the case the parts are sometimes not all written in the score, but the lines belonging to one or more of the instruments are left blank, and the words coi violini or col basso, etc., are added, to indicate that the instruments in question have to play in unison with the violins or basses, as the case may be, or when two instruments of the same kind, such as first and second violins, have to play in unison, the word unisono or col primo is placed instead of the notes in the line belonging to the second. Where two parts are written on one staff in a score the sign a 2 denotes that both play the same notes; and a 1 that the second of the two is resting. The indication a 3 or a 4 at the head of fugues indicates the number of parts or voices in which the fugue is written.

An abbreviation which is often very troublesome to the conductor occurs in manuscript scores, when a considerable part of the composition is repeated without alteration, and the corresponding number of bars are left vacant, with the remark come sopra (as above). This is not met with in printed scores.

== Chord abbreviations used in music theory ==
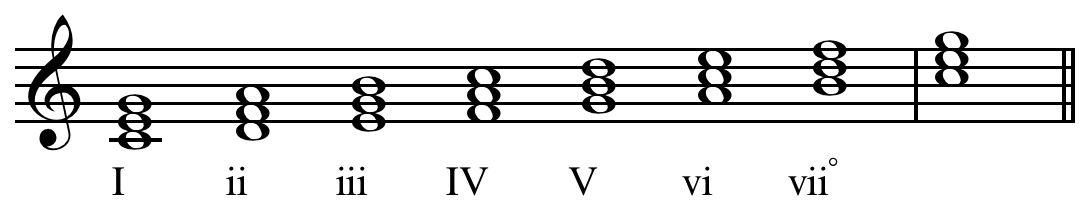
Root position triads of the C major scale indicated using Roman numeral analysis.

There are also abbreviations relating to music analysis, some of which are of great value. In figured bass, for instance, the various chords are expressed by figures, and the several authors in the nineteenth century invented or availed themselves of various methods of shortly expressing the different chords and intervals, particularly using Roman numeral analysis.

Gottfried Weber represents an interval by a number with one or two dots before it to express minor or diminished, and one or two after it for major or augmented.

Johann Anton André makes use of a right triangle to express a triad, and a square, for a seventh chord, the inversions being indicated by one, two, or three small vertical lines across their base, and the classification into major, minor, diminished, or augmented by the numbers 1, 2, 3, or 4, placed in the centre.
