= Repeat sign =

Musical notation indicating repetition

Repeat signs around the second note. This will be played as “A, B, B, C.”
Single repeat sign only. This will be played as “A, B, A, B, C.”

In musical notation, a repeat sign is a sign that indicates a section should be repeated. A section to be repeated will be enclosed by repeat barlines. If the piece has one repeat barline alone, either at the end of the piece or anywhere in between, the piece will be played again from the beginning. These are similar to the instructions da capo and dal segno.

Repeat. Wiederholungszeichen (Ger.) A sign that a movement or part of a movement is to be twice performed. That which is to be repeated is generally included within the sign of two or four dots in the spaces...When the performer does not, on repeating, go so far as the last dot-sign, but finishes at a previous cadence, it is usual to write over the repeat, Da Capo, placing a pause and fine over the chord at which the performer is to stop. If the signs of the repeat do not coincide with a well-defined portion of a movement the [segno] sign 𝄋 [] is sometimes added.

== Different endings ==
Repeat sign with first and second endings. The notes are played as: A, B, C, B, D

When a repeat calls for a different ending, numbered brackets above the bars indicate which to play the first time (1.), which to play the second time (2.), and so on if necessary. These are called "first-time bars" and "second-time bars", or "first and second endings". They are also known as "volta brackets" and although there are normally 2 volta brackets, there is no limit to how many there can be.

== In Unicode ==
In Unicode, repeat signs are part of the Musical Symbols and they are coded as follows:

Decimal	Hexadecimal	Character	Official designation
119046	1D106	𝄆	U+1D106 MUSICAL SYMBOL LEFT REPEAT SIGN
119047	1D107	𝄇	U+1D107 MUSICAL SYMBOL RIGHT REPEAT SIGN

== Other notation ==
When only standard keyboard characters are available, the punctuation marks, vertical bar, and colon are used to represent repeat signs: |: ... :|

In Gregorian chant, a repeat is indicated by a Roman numeral (or possibly an abbreviation for the Latin idem) following a section. This is common particularly in a Kyrie, where the lines followed by iii or iij are to be sung three times (corresponding to the correct liturgical form).

In shape-note singing, repeat signs usually have four dots, between each line of the staff. The corresponding sign to show where the repeat is from is either the same sign reversed (if it is at the beginning of a bar), or the dots themselves (if it is in the middle of a bar). First and second endings are given with just the numbers above the corresponding bars. Repeats notated at the beginning of a verse, or given with multiple lines of text per verse, are generally required; the repeats given for most songs of the final few lines are always optional, and almost always used only for the final verse sung.

== See also ==
- Abbreviation (music)
- Coda
- Da capo
- Dal segno
- Repetition (music)
