= Coda (music) =

Passage that brings a musical piece to an end

In music, a coda (/ˈkoʊdə/; Italian for 'tail'; plural code) is a passage that brings a piece (or a movement) to an end. It may be as simple as a few measures, or as complex as an entire section.

== In classical music ==
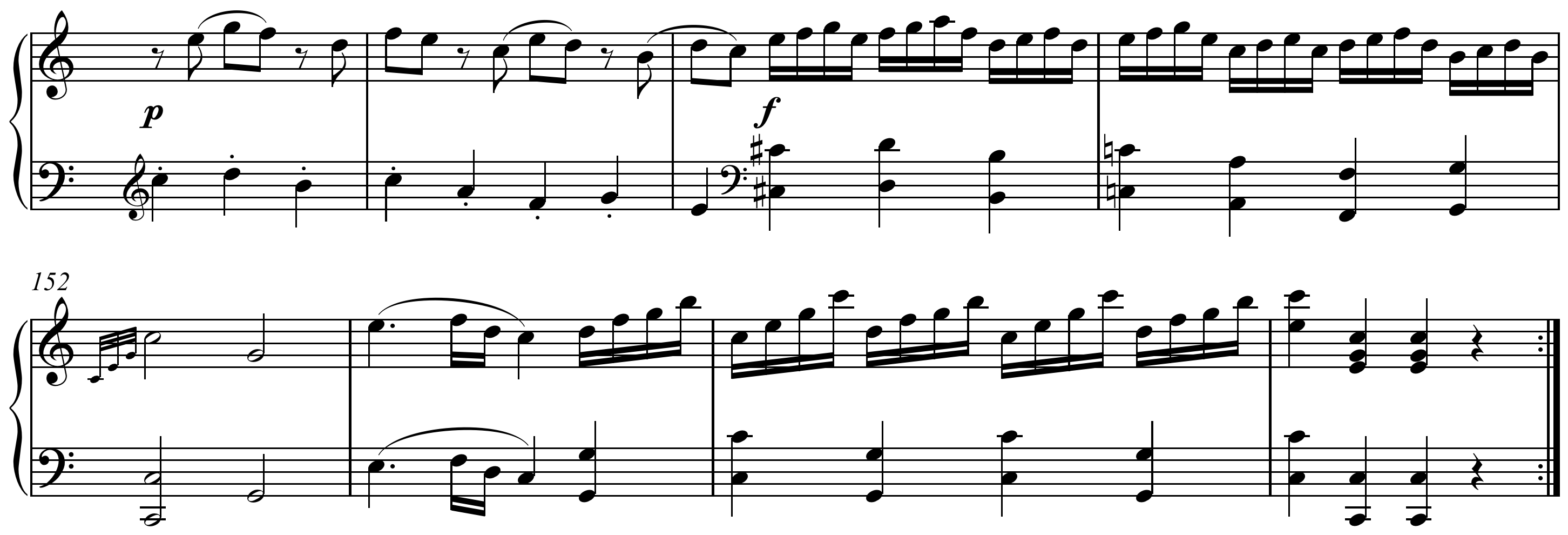
Coda from Mozart's Piano Sonata no. 7 in C Major, K. 309, I, mm. 152–155.

The presence of a coda as a structural element in a movement is especially clear in works written in particular musical forms. Codas were commonly used in both sonata form and variation movements during the Classical era. In a sonata form movement, the recapitulation section will, in general, follow the exposition in its thematic content, while adhering to the home key. The recapitulation often ends with a passage that sounds like a termination, paralleling the music that ended the exposition; thus, any music coming after this termination will be perceived as extra material, i.e., as a coda. In works in variation form, the coda occurs following the last variation and will be very noticeable as the first music not based on the theme.

One of the ways that Beethoven extended and intensified Classical practice was to expand the coda sections, producing a final section sometimes of equal musical weight to the foregoing exposition, development, and recapitulation sections and completing the musical argument. For one famous example, see the finale of Symphony No. 8 (Beethoven).

=== Musical purpose ===
Charles Burkhart suggests that the reason codas are common, even necessary, is that, in the climax of the main body of a piece, a "particularly effortful passage", often an expanded phrase, is often created by "working an idea through to its structural conclusions" and that, after all this momentum is created, a coda is required to "look back" on the main body, allow listeners to "take it all in", and "create a sense of balance."

=== Codetta ===
Codetta (Italian for "little tail", the diminutive form) has a similar purpose to the coda, but on a smaller scale, concluding a section of a work instead of the work as a whole. A typical codetta concludes the exposition and recapitulation sections of a work in sonata form, following the second (modulated) theme, or the closing theme (if there is one). Thus, in the exposition, it usually appears in the secondary key, but, in the recapitulation, in the primary key. The codetta ordinarily closes with a perfect cadence in the appropriate key, confirming the tonality. If the exposition is repeated, the codetta is likewise repeated. Sometimes it has its ending slightly changed, depending on whether it leads back to the exposition or into the development sections.

== History ==
Cauda, a Latin word meaning "tail", "edge" or "trail" is the root of coda and is used in the study of conductus of the 12th and 13th centuries. The cauda was a long melisma on one of the last syllables of the text, repeated in each strophe. Conducti were traditionally divided into two groups, conductus cum cauda and conductus sine cauda (Latin: "conductus with cauda", "conductus without cauda"), based on the presence of the melisma. Thus, the cauda provided a conclusionary role, similar to the modern coda.

== In popular music ==
Many songs in rock and other genres of popular music have sections identifiable as codas. A coda in these genres is sometimes referred to as an "outro", while in jazz, modern church music and barbershop arranging it is commonly called a "tag". One of the most famous codas is found in the 1968 single "Hey Jude" by the Beatles. The coda lasted nearly four minutes, making the song's full length at just over the seven-minute mark.

== In music notation ==
Coda sign

In music notation, the coda symbol, which resembles a set of crosshairs, is used as a navigation marker, similar to the dal segno sign. It is used where the exit from a repeated section is within that section rather than at the end. The instruction "To Coda" indicates that, upon reaching that point during the final repetition, the performer is to jump immediately to the separate section headed with the coda symbol. The instruction "D. C. al Coda" tells you to go back to the start until you hit the coda, then jump to the section with the symbol. "D. S. al Coda" tells you to go back to the segno, and play from there until the coda and eventually to the section with the coda. The symbol can be used to provide a special ending for the final verse of a song.

The coda sign is encoded in the Musical Symbols block of Unicode as U+1D10C MUSICAL SYMBOL CODA: 𝄌

== See also ==
- Coda (ballet)
- Da capo
- Epilogue
- Fade (audio engineering)
- Repeat sign
- Transition (music)
