= Neutral level =

In semiotics the neutral level of a sign is the "trace" left behind; the physical or material creation or remains of esthesic and poietic processes, levels, and analyses of symbolic forms. A part of all signs according to a tri-partitional definition, it corresponds to Saussure's "sound-image" (or "signified", thus Pierce's "representamen").

Thus, "a symbolic form...is not some 'intermediary' in a process of 'communication' that transmits the meaning intended by the author to the audience; it is instead the result of a complex process of creation (the poetic process) that has to do with the form as well as the content of the work; it is also the point of departure for a complex process of reception (the esthesic process that reconstructs a 'message.')"

Molino and Nattiez's diagram:

Poietic Process			Esthesic Process
"Producer"	→	Trace	←	Receiver

An immanent description is an analysis of the neutral level.(Nattiez 1990, p. 75).

== Applied Semiotics ==
In an applied semiology the neutral level of a sign is the "trace" left behind by a spiritual or ideal creation (i.e. art, masterpiece etc.); or fruits of creative processes and multi-staged levels of realisations, including analysis of the qualities of the symbolic forms as a consequence of an arousement of the analyst's or artist's mindfullness as one of several factors for reaching an understandment of the neutral level of applied semiology depending on the frames of reference (i.e. corporeal/physical, emotional/distribution of resources - economy, intellectual/cerebral, artistic/spiritual."

== The Neutral level of the Neutral level ==
"Neutral" comes from the English word refers to a mutually understood non-dual background. "Neuter" has been used since the 14th century and is composed of ne meaning "not" + uter meaning which of two, thus synonymous with either [1] The Neutral state is often misinterpreted as a passive state, but it should be understood as much not-passive as not-active or equal. It literally refers to the non-dual state of body and mind, you and me or of any conflict.

== Sources ==
- Nattiez, Jean-Jacques (1990). Music and Discourse: Toward a Semiology of Music (Musicologie générale et sémiologue, 1987). Translated by Carolyn Abbate (1990). ISBN 0-691-02714-5.
