= Dario Martinelli =

Italian semiotician, musicologist and compose

Dario Martinelli (born Andria, Italy, March 1, 1974) is an Italian semiotician, musicologist and composer.

Since 2012 he has been working at Kaunas University of Technology, Lithuania, as Full Professor in history and theory of arts He was the director of the International Semiotics Institute, and he is also affiliated to the University of Helsinki and the University of Lapland (adjunct professor in both cases). His visiting professorships include the University of Torino (2015–2016), the Lithuanian Academy of Music and Theatre (2012–2014), the Finnish Network University of Semiotics (2004–2007) and the Fine Arts Academy of Bari (2005–2006).

Martinelli graduated at Bologna University in 1999 and earned his PhD at Helsinki University in 2002.

He performs research and publishes monographs and articles in the fields of musicology, popular music studies, film studies, semiotics, animal studies (he is possibly best known for his work in zoomusicology and zoosemiotics) and a research platform called "numanities", devoted to the rethinking of the role and paradigm of the humanities in modern society.

He founded the Springer book series Numanities - Arts and Humanities in Progress, Martinelli is also a member of several editorial and scientific boards in journals, doctoral committees and academic associations.

In 2006, Martinelli was knighted by the Italian Republic for his contribution to Italian culture. He is also the youngest winner of the Oscar Parland Prize for Prominent Semioticians, awarded by Helsinki University (2004).

As a composer, he has written music for films and for experimental projects, but he is mostly active as songwriter, having composed music and lyrics for Anna Maria Castelli, Gabisoul and his own musical project Jays & Ducks, with Justas Pilibaitis. The Jays&Ducks' song "All the air we won't breathe" is featured in Martin Basile's short movie "La riga in mezzo".

== Honors ==
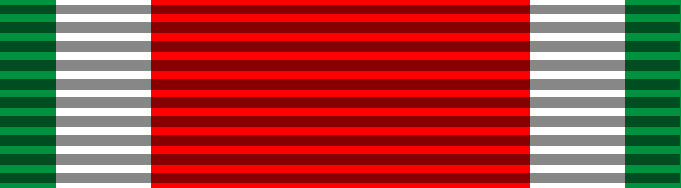
Knight of the Order of the Star of Italy – June 1, 2006
