= Barococo =

In music Barococo is a term coined by musicologist H.C. Robbins-Landon which refers to a certain type of easy listening music that originated in the Baroque and pre-Classic periods. Specifically, Barococo music has been described as "crisp, impersonal, concertante music" (Fink 2005, p. 172).

A portmanteau of the words Baroque and Rococo, the term was originally used as a criticism of the characteristic ease with which the average listener could enjoy this style of music at the height of Baroque revival in the first half of the 20th century. The emergence of long playing records made it possible for recordings of Baroque music to be played in repetition over a long period of time, leading individuals like Robbins-Landon to label it as repetitive. Critics viewed the lack of distinction between individual pieces and the uninterrupted play of these records to encourage a mode of listening that required neither attention nor comprehension of structure, and thereby started referring to the music pejoratively as Barococo

See also: Seymour DeKoven, Jeff Koons.

== Sources ==
- Fink, Robert (2005). Repeating Ourselves: American Minimal Music as Cultural Practice. ISBN 0-520-24550-4.
