= Figurae =

Sign component in semiotics

Figurae (singular, figura) are the non-signifying constituents of signifiers (signs). For example, letters of the alphabet are the figurae that comprise a written word (signifier). In the semiotic language of Louis Hjelmslev, the coiner of this term, figurae serve only to distinguish elements (e.g. words) of the expression plane from each other, independently from the content plane. That is, the letter B, in the written word expression "bat", distinguishes "bat" from the word "sat", but neither B nor S bears meaning on its own. On the other hand, the constituents "foot" and "ball" both bear their own individual meanings, such that in the word "football", they cannot be considered figurae, although their individual letters can. Hjelmslev states that in a given language a "legion of signs" can be constructed with a "handful of figurae" through ever new arrangements of them. Linguists often use the terms phonemes and morphemes to refer, respectively, to the figurae and the signifiers of human languages.

The division of the stream of speech into meaningful morphemes plus their further subdivision into meaningless elements is known as the double articulation. This duality of patterning of language is one of the few facts of language which most schools of linguistics can agree on. Occasionally, two morphemes can combine in an arbitrary way into a new morpheme, as in double names such as Mary-Alice, John-Paul, and Sarah-Jean, creating a kind of triple articulation. English speakers recognize Mary and Alice as parts of the name Mary-Alice, yet they understand that a woman of that name is in no way a combination of two other women. But neither are double given names typical of English, nor are surnames meaningless, since surnames usually identify a family relationship. As far as the combination of meaningful elements is concerned, there is much less agreement on what constitutes a syntagm (e.g. foot-ball, I-am) and whether any such syntax is universal.

In theory, any sign could be composed of figurae, but care must be taken in distinguishing between the control-number-like function of figurae (as in the individual digits of a telephone extension) and the syntax-like function of meaning constituents (as in the area code of a full telephone number). For example, the symbols for the lines of the New York City subway system are composed of very elementary parts, e.g., letters or numbers and colors. While the assignment of letters to trains is arbitrary, and colors are arbitrarily assigned to various avenues in Manhattan, the combination of a letter or number and color is not arbitrary. That is, the symbol for the A Train has to be blue, since it runs along Eighth Avenue and all other Eighth Avenue train symbols are blue. Therefore, these colors cannot be considered figurae.

On the other hand, the flags of a dozen countries consist of three horizontal bars, distinguished by their colors. It can be said that the colors and bars form a system of signifiers, consisting of the color figurae in a vertical order. For example, the flag of Russia is made up of a white, a blue, and a red bar, from top to bottom, whereas the flag of Estonia consists of a blue, a black and a white bar. From the point of view of a vexillologist, the colors have no meaning until they are grouped together and form the national symbol. Although white, blue and red may be "national colors" of Russia, combined in a different order they form the flag of Luxembourg.

In reality, most national flags do not conform to the three-horizontal-band pattern. Furthermore, national flags vary somewhat in their horizontal and vertical proportions, and shades of colors can differ. Nevertheless, this logical analysis of flags into horizontal-color-bar figurae, though not exact, would probably be arrived at by almost anyone comparing these 12 national symbols. But it is also possible to over-analyze signs. For example, a television picture of a flag would consist of thousands of meaningless pixels. A recording of speech could be digitized on a CD into millions of meaningless bits. Neither of these mechanical divisions could be considered figurae. It would seem, then, that since signs are defined as entities recognized by sentient beings (including many animal species), the constituents of signs, figurae, must also be easily recognizable as entities, even though they have no meaning in themselves. It probably requires a lot of specialization or intelligence to mentally process figurae, since it demands not only the disassociation of the characteristics of a symbol with those of its referent, but this disassociation has to be repeated for each figura that comprises the arbitrary symbol. Figurae have not yet been recognized in any non-human natural communication system. Although the honeybee waggle dance may involve some arbitrary symbols, they are combined with non-arbitrary ones, much like the subway line symbols.
