= Da capo =

Musical term meaning "from the beginning"

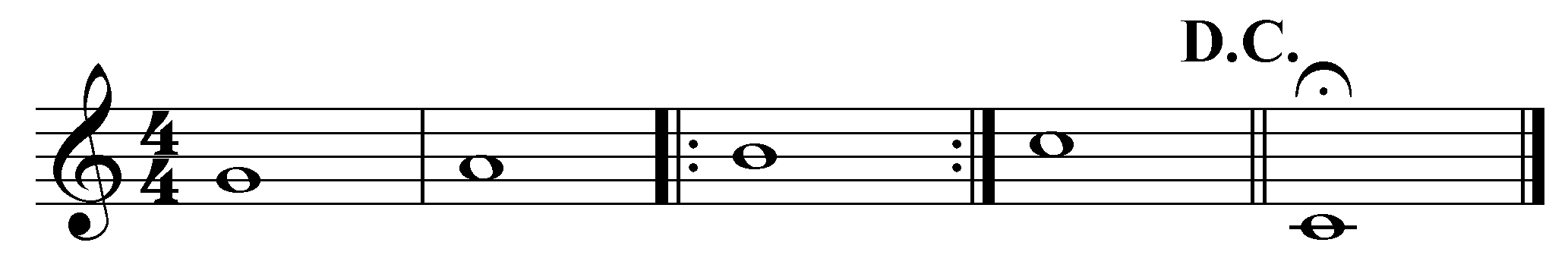
A contrived example of D.C. al Fine. Use of Da Capo prevents the need to write out extra measures, often many more than in this example. The notes are played as: G A B B C, G A B C, low-C

Da capo (/dɑː ˈkɑːpoʊ/ dah KAH-poh, US also /də -/ də -, Italian: [da (k)ˈkaːpo]; often abbreviated as D.C.) is an Italian musical term that means "from the beginning" (literally, "from the head"). The term is a directive to repeat the previous part of music, often used to save space, and thus is an easier way of saying to repeat the music from the beginning.

In small pieces, this might be the same thing as a repeat. But in larger works, D.C. might occur after one or more repeats of small sections, indicating a return to the very beginning. The resulting structure of the piece is generally in ternary form. Sometimes, the composer describes the part to be repeated, for example: Menuet da capo. In opera, where an aria of this structure is called a da capo aria, the repeated section is often adorned with grace notes.

The word Fine (Ital. 'end') is generally placed above the stave at the point where the movement ceases after a 'Da capo' repetition. Its place is occasionally taken by a pause (see fermata)."

== Variations ==
- Da Capo al Fine (often abbreviated as D.C. al Fine): Repeat from beginning to the end, or up to the word Fine (should that appear at the end of the passage)—the word Fine itself signifying the end.

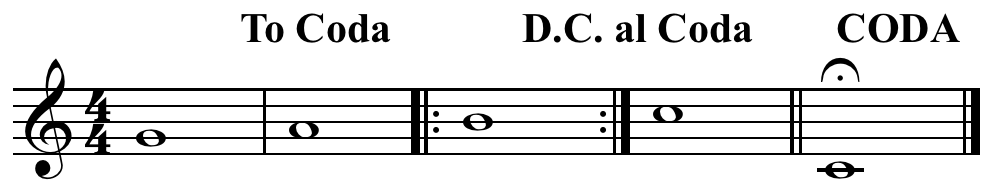
A similar example showing D.C. al Coda. The notes are played as: G A B B C, G A, low-C

- Da Capo al Coda (often abbreviated as D.C. al Coda): Repeat from beginning to an indicated place and then play the tail part (the "Coda"). It directs the musician to go back and repeat the music from the beginning ("Capo"), and to continue playing until one reaches the first coda symbol. Upon reaching the first coda symbol, skip to the second coda symbol and continue playing until the end. The portion of the piece from the second coda to the end is often referred to as the "coda" of the piece, or quite literally as "the tail". This may also be instructed by simply using the words al Coda after which the musician is to skip to the written word Coda.
- Da Capo al Segno (often abbreviated as D.C. al Segno): It means "From the beginning to the sign (𝄋)".

== See also ==
- Coda (music)
- Repeat sign
- Dal segno (DS al coda)
