= Eero Tarasti =

Finnish musicologist and semiotician

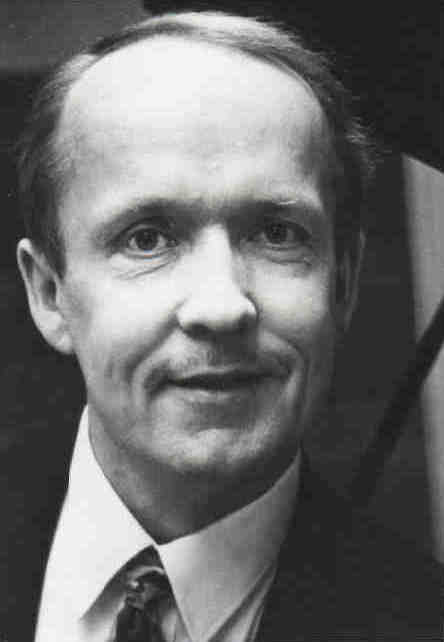
Eero Tarasti

Eero Aarne Pekka Tarasti (born 27 September 1948 in Helsinki) is a Finnish musicologist and semiotician, currently serving as Professor Emeritus of Musicology at the University of Helsinki. He has contributed significantly to the semiotics of music.

He received his Ph.D. degree at the University of Helsinki in 1978, writing his dissertation Myth and Music on Richard Wagner, Jean Sibelius, and Igor Stravinsky. Then, Tarasti served at the University of Jyväskylä between 1979–1984, where he was appointed Professor of Arts Education in 1979 and Professor of Musicology in 1983. In 1984 he took the position of Professor of Musicology in Helsinki, succeeding Erik Tawaststjerna. Tarasti has held posts as Director or President in several semiotic and musical societies and since the 1970s has written and edited numerous books encompassing a semiotic approach to music. He has been the President of the International Association for Semiotic Studies (2004–2014), and the Director of the International Semiotics Institute.

Eero Tarasti is married to Eila Marita Elisabet Tarasti, pianist and musicologist.

== Education ==
=== Finland ===
Eero Tarasti went to school at Helsinki Normal Lyceum, the classical line, where he became baccalaureat in 1967 (with six laudatur grades): Then he studied at the University of Helsinki 1967–1975, first theoretical philosophy, then sociology and aesthetics and, at the end, musicology. He got his Ph.D. at the University of Helsinki 1978 with the thesis entitled Myth and Music (published in 1979 by Mouton de Gruyter, Berlin). At the same time he enrolled at music studies (piano) at the Sibelius Academy, Helsinki 1967–1975. Among his piano teachers were Liisa Pohjola, Timo Mikkilä and Tapani Valsta. Earlier he had studied privately piano with Kaisa Arjava.

=== Studies abroad ===
He pursued music studies in Vienna 1972 with Noel Flores and then in Paris 1973 with Jules Gentil (École Normale de Musique), with Jacques Février 1974-75: he continued his music studies in Rio de Janeiro with Heitor Alimonda (1976) and then in the US with Walter Robert and Joseph Rezits in Bloomington (1987); in Helsinki he followed a course in piano pedagogy by professor Gunnar Hallhagen, and private course by Jan Hoffmann. He got the grant of French Government for doctoral studies in Paris, in 1974-75 (Ecole des Hautes Etudes en Sciences Sociales, professor A.J. Greimas as his supervisor); he also followed teaching at Collège de France, and met a.o. Claude Lévi-Strauss and Roland Barthes. In Rio de Janeiro 1976 (Universidade Federal) he pursued anthropological studies as an awardee of Rotary International.

== Career ==
His first chair was at Arts Education, University of Jyväskylä (Middle Finland) 1979–83; then he served there one year as professor of Musicology, 1983–84 and was nominated as Professor of Musicology at the University of Helsinki, 1984–2016. He continues there his teaching as an emeritus professor.

Other Academic Activities:

He was elected President of the IASS/AIS (International Association for Semiotic Studies), for two periods in 2004–2014, and before he had already been two periods as its Vice-President in 1990–2004; moreover he has been Founder and President of the Semiotic Society of Finland, since 1979. When the International Semiotics Institute was founded in Imatra, Finland (ISI) upon initiative of Prof. Thomas A. Sebeok (Indiana University, Bloomington) he was elected its first President in 1988. He chaired it until 2013 when the institute was moved to Kaunas Technological University, Lithuania.

In musical field he is the Founder and President of the Music Society of University of Helsinki, since 1989; In 1986 an international research project Musical Signification was established at French Broadcast company in 1986 - since then Eero Tarasti has been its director. He was also Director of the Finnish Network University of Semiotics, 2004-2013 (funded by the EU); he worked as Research director (part-time) at the University of Lapland, Rovaniemi (2008-2014) for founding the pan-European doctoral program in semiotics, SEMKNOW. He is also Founder and President of the Academy of Cultural Heritages (ACU) since 2016.

Abroad:

Eero Tarasti has had many nominations for foreign universities. Among them we can count: Fellow of the Japan Foundation 1991;Fellow of the Advanced Studies Institute at the Indiana University, Bloomington in 1993; Research Associate at the RCLSS (Research Center for Language and Semiotic Studies, IU; Bloomington) in 1987 and 1994;Visiting Professor at the University of Paris I, Sorbonne in the Spring of 1995; Visiting Professor at the University of Tartu, Estonia, 1997–98;Visiting Professor at the University of Minnesota, Minneapolis, 1999;Visiting Professor at the University of Paris VIII, 2002; Visiting Professor at the University of Aix en Provence, 2002;Poste d’accueil pour recherche par CNRS/Université de Paris I (Pantheon-Sorbonne), 2008;

Moreover, he was Membre du Conseil Scientifique & Ecole Doctorale Arts Plastiques, esthétique et sciences de l'art, Université de Paris I-Panthéon Sorbonne, in 1998–2012; In addition he has served as Member of the Board at Istituto Superiore Scienze Umane (directed by Umberto Eco), Bologna, since 2005.

Eero Tarasti has guest lectured in almost all the European Countries, Russia, Kazakhstan, Iran, United States, Mexico, Brazil, Argentina, Chile, Peru, Japan and China.

He has organized over 80 international symposia and congresses in Finland and abroad; he has supervised and attended defences of 107 doctoral theses in Finland and abroad

== Memberships ==
He was member of the Executive Committee of the IASS/AIS (International Association for Semiotic Studies) in 1979–2000; Member of the Academia Europaea since 1987; Member of the Academy of Informatization, Moscow since 1994; Member of the Board of the South-Eastern European Semiotic Center, Bulgaria, since 2000; Member of the Grant Selection Committee for the International Kyoto Prize, Japan, 1996; Member of the Wihuri Foundation International Prize Committee 2000, 2003, 2005, 2009 and 2015. He was President of the Finnish Musicological Society 1995-98 and President of the Finnish Society for Aesthetic 1986–87; he is Member of the Finnish Science Society since 1998 and Member of the Scientific Academy of Finland since 1990

He is Member of the Board of Niilo Helander Foundation; he was Member of the Board of Pro Musica Foundation 1984–2010; Member of the Board of Promotion of Finnish Art Music Foundation 1984–1997; Member of the Council for Arts Education by the Finnish Parliament, 2011- Member of the Cultural Board of Southern Savo Region, Finland, 2011-

In the publishing field he is active in the following journals and academic series: he is Member of the International Editorial Board of "Seemiootikee", Sign Systems Studies, University of Tartu; Member of the International Editorial Board of the Journal "DeSignis" (Publicacion de la Federación Latinoamericana de Semiótica);Member of the International Editorial Board of the Journal ’Signa’ (Spanish Society of Semiotics); Member of the Editorial Board of Interdisciplinary Studies in Musicology (Poznan);Member of the Editorial Board of “Lithuanian musicology”; Member of the Advisory Board of TRANS (electronic journal on musicology and ethnomusicology, Barcelona); Member of the Advisory Panel of “Musica Humana”, Journal of Korean Institute of Musicology; Member of the Advisory Board of “Perspectiva Interdisciplinaria de Musica”, UNAM, Mexico; Member of the Honorary Committee of LEXIA, Journal of Semiotics, Turin, Italy; Member of the Editorial Board of Jean Sibelius Gesamtausgabe; Chief Advisor of the Chinese Semiotic Studies, Nanjing Normal University Press; Member of the Editorial Board of Revista EIMAS (Encontro Internacional de Música e Arte Sonora), Universidade Federal de Juiz de Fora, Brasil (from 2011 on); Member of the Scientific committee of the publishing series Théories et critiques, at L’Harmattan, Paris, since 2011; Member of the Board of Journal of Chongqing Jiaotong University, since 2015; Member of the Editorial Board of Advisers at Central Asian Journal of Art Studies, Kazak National University of Al Farabi, Almaty, Kazakhstan, since 2015

== Media ==
"Sémiotique et musicologie - Eero Tarasti", a film about the life and work of Eero Tarasti, in French and English (4 hours), produced by Maison des Sciences de L'Homme, by professor Peter Stockinger, Paris, 2004, in the collection "Entretiens. Les archives de la recherche en sciences humaines et sociales" (available also at internet: https://arquivo.pt/wayback/20141126071357/http%3A//www.fmsh.fr/)

== Honors ==
Eero Tarasti has received several international honours as follows:

- Honorary Doctor of Humane Letters, Indiana University, Bloomington, 1997;
- Honorary Doctor of the Estonian Music Academy, 1999;
- Honorary Doctor of the New Bulgarian University, Sofia, 2001
- Honorary Doctor at Université Aix-Marseille, 2014
- Honorary Doctor at “Georghe Dima” Music Academy, Cluj-Napoca, Rumania, 2016

He is also Honorary Fellow of the Victoria College, University of Toronto; Fellow of the International Communicology Institute, Washington D.C., USA, 2010 In Finland he got the J.V.Snellman Prize of the University of Helsinki 1997 and the Science Prize of the City of Helsinki, 1998; he is Honorary Member of the Richard Wagner Society in Finland 2008

He has been decorated by the 1st Class Medal of the White Rose Order of Finland 1999 The Medal of the Order of Rio Branco, Brazil (the category of Officials) 2000, and by Chevalier de l’Ordre Palme Académique, France, 2004

== Books ==
- Heitor Villa-Lobos 1996 (North Carolina: McFarland; in Finnish 1987)
- Semiotics of Music (ed.) 1987 (Semiotica)
- La musique comme language I-II (ed.) 1987-88 (Degres)
- Semiotics of Music (ed. in electronic journal Applied Semiotics, Toronto, Canada); Heroes of Music (in Finnish) 1988
- Center and Periphery (ed. Acta Semiotica Fennica ASF) 1990
- Introduction to Semiotics (in Finnish) 1990
- Sémiologie et pratiques esthetiques (ed.) 1991 (Degres)
- Semiotics of Finland (ed.) 1991 (Semiotica)
- On the Borderlines of Semiosis (ed. ASF) 1992
- The Dream and Exaltation of Romanticism (in Finnish) 1992
- A Theory of Musical Semiotics (Bloomington: Indiana University Press, 1994)
- Myth and Music. A Semiotic Approach to the Aesthetics of Myth in Music, especially that of Wagner, Sibelius and Stravinsky 1979 (Berlin: Mouton; in Finnish 1994; in French Mythe et musique, Michel de Maule 2003)
- Musical Signification (ed.) (Berlin: Mouton) 1995
- Musical Semiotics in Growth (ed. ASF/IU Press) 1996
- La sémiotique musicale (Presses Universitaires de Limoges) 1996
- Examples (in Finnish) 1996
- Snow, Forest, Silence. The Finnish Tradition of Semiotics (ed.) 1998
- The Correspondence (of the School Years and Years of Formation) between E.T. and Hannu Riikonen 1961-76 (in Finnish) 1998
- Musical Signification: Between Rhetoric and Pragmatics (ed. together with Gino Stefani and Luca Marconi), (CLUEB, Bologna) 1998
- Existential Semiotics (Bloomington: Indiana University Press) 2000
- Le secret du professeur Amfortas (novel, in French, Paris: L'Harmattan) 2000
- Signs of Music (Berlin: Walter de Gruyter) 2002
- The Realities of Music. An Encyclopedia (in Finnish) (Helsinki University Press, 2003)
- Values and Signs (in Finnish) (Helsinki: Gaudeamus) 2004
- Portraits – Interpretations, Reminiscences, Stories (in Finnish, Imatra: ISI), 2006
- La musique et ses signes (Paris: L’Harmattan) 2006
- Music and the Arts I-II, (Imatra, Acta semiotica fennica), 2006
- Maamme Suomi (Our Land Finland), ed. together with A. Tiitta, J. Nummi and R. Stewen, Helsinki: Weilin et Göös, 2007
- Fondamenti di semiotica esistenziale (transl. by M. Berruti), Bari-Roma: Laterza Editore, 2009
- Fondements de la sémiotique existentielle (traduction par Jean-Laurent Csinidis), Paris: L’Harmattan 2009
- Existenzialnaja semiotika (in Bulgarian, transl. by Ivaylo Krastev, Kristian Bankov), Sofia: New Bulgarian University 2009
- Communication – Understanding/Misunderstanding. Proceedings from the 9th World Congress of IASS/AIS (ed.) I-III, Imatra: Acta semiotica fennica, 2009
- I segni della musica. Che cosa ci dicono i suoni, Milano: Ricordi/LIM, 2010
- Foundations of Existential Semiotics 2012 (the Chinese edition by Sichuan University Press)
- Semiotics of Classical Music: How Mozart, Brahms and Wagner Talk To Us 2012, Berlin: Mouton de Gruyter
- Music and Humanism. Essays 2003-2013 (in Finnish), Joensuu: University Press of Eastern Finland, 2013
- Retour à la Villa Nevski (roman) Paris: Editions Impliquées 2014
- L’eredità di Villa Nevski (romanzo), Lanciano: Casa Editrice Rocco Carabba, 2014
- Sein und Schein. Explorations in Existential Semiotics. 2015 (New York: Mouton de Gruyter
- Eurooppa/Ehkä (Europe/Perhaps), (a novel, in Finnish), 2016 Jyväskylä: Athanor
- Sémiotique de la musique classique, 2016, Aix en Provence : Presses Universitaires de Provence.
