= Seymour DeKoven =

Seymour DeKoven (November 25, 1903 – October 29, 1984), generally known simply as DeKoven, was a United States classical music radio personality of the 1950s, 1960s, 1970s, and early 1980s. Because of his penchant for mixing short musical segments with enthusiastic commentary, he could be called a "classical music disk jockey". His unique style was utterly different from that of any popular-music disk jockey but was also worlds apart from the dignified manner of other classical radio notables such as Robert J. Lurtsema of WGBH, Boston and Robert Conrad of WCLV, Cleveland.

He played exclusively music of the baroque and rococo eras. He is identified with the word "barococo" in reference to music of that time, a coinage that became familiar and understood, but was never widely adopted. In his obituary, The New York Times called him "passionately opinionated." In the U. S. prior to the 1960s, baroque music was known mostly to musicians and scholars, and was relatively unfamiliar to the general classical listening audience. DeKoven's broadcasts coincided with what is sometimes referred to as the "1960s baroque revival," a sharp rise in popular interest in the music.

His program, "DeKoven Presents," was broadcast from Fordham University's WFUV, but was also carried in taped form by many other university and non-commercial radio stations. One of the last stations to faithfully air the program was WAWZ-FM [99.1] in Zarephath, NJ; on Saturday afternoon at 1:05. He taped nearly 600 one-hour programs currently archived at the University of Wyoming's American Heritage Center. In his later years, his secretary was Gertrude Feltz of Queens, N.Y. and his assistant was Howard Garrett of Montgomery, New York.

DeKoven, who generally used only his last name, tended to wax enthusiastic over every piece of music he selected for play. He characterized many of them as "OTW," Out of This World. OTW was only the bottom step of a set of escalating accolades which included "Super OTW," "Super Super OTW," and occasionally "OTG" (Out of This Galaxy), "OTU" (Out of This Universe) and "OTC" (Out of This Cosmos). Other phrases DeKoven used included "Remember, even a 3 by 5 inch index card can be used as a post card!" or at the conclusion of a broadcast when soliciting donations for his "Barococo Society," he would always remind his listeners when addressing their letters "....please skip the Sir or Mister when mailing me. Just capital DeK-o-v-e-n. I see this as an anachronism, especially in the Arts." He also reminded listeners that "I am a lone wolf..." about his endeavor.

His requests for correspondence were not motivated by money alone. He used the correspondence to demonstrate that he had a listening audience so radio stations would continue to broadcast his show.

Rather than playing entire compositions, he tended to play only the portions he liked, generally preferring the fast movements and omitting the slow ones. Occasionally he would play a piece, say "Wasn't that wonderful? Let's play it again!" and would play it again. Another quirky habit was to reply to those who criticized his omission of slow movements. He would occasionally deny doing this, and purport to demonstrate his love for slow movements as well by playing one. But this would then be followed by a Super OTW fast movement and no further slow movements would be heard on his show.

His noncommercial program was supported by listener donations, which he solicited tirelessly on the air. Some listeners found his quirky mannerisms annoying, but many found his enthusiasm infectious and amusing.
