= Esthesic and poietic =

Terms used in the study of signs

Esthesic (UK aesthesic) and poietic are terms used in semiotics, the study of signs, to describe perceptive and productive levels, processes, and analyses of symbolic forms. The corresponding terms for the processes are esthesis and poiesis.

Like 'emic' and 'etic', both words appear to be derived from a suffix, -poietic (from Greek: ποιητικός "creative") meaning productive or formative and -esthesic (from αἴσθησις "sense") being receptive or perceptive, in relation to the neutral level. The neutral level is the "trace" left behind, the physical or material creation of esthesic and poietic processes.

Thus, for Jean-Jacques Nattiez,

a symbolic form... is not some 'intermediary' in a process of 'communication' that transmits the meaning intended by the author to the audience; it is instead the result of a complex process of creation (the poietic process) that has to do with the form as well as the content of the work; it is also the point of departure for a complex process of reception (the esthesic process) that reconstructs a 'message.' (Nattiez 1990, p. 17)

Nattiez's diagram, following Jean Molino:

Poietic Process			Esthesic Process
"Producer"	→	Trace	←	Receiver

(ibid.)

"Esthesic" also refers to the mental perception of any body part. "-poesis"/"-poetics" also refers to production.

== See also ==
- Autopoietic
- Poiesis

== Sources ==
- Nattiez, Jean-Jacques (1990). Music and Discourse: Toward a Semiology of Music (Musicologie générale et sémiologue, 1987). Translated by Carolyn Abbate (1990). ISBN 0-691-02714-5.
