= International Semiotics Institute =

Lithuanian-based research institute

Coordinates: 54°53′57″N 23°55′2″E

The International Semiotics Institute (abbreviated as ISI) is an international research institute, devoted to the study and dissemination of semiotics and interdisciplinary studies. Activities include research, publications, academic events, teaching, consultations, training and supervision, but also extra-academic projects focused on social progress and sustainability.

ISI was born in 1988 in Imatra, Finland, on initiative of the Toronto Semiotic Circle. The institute was created in order to promote international teaching of semiotics and to facilitate the mobility of students in the field. After few years, the project turned into a center for research and events. Since the beginning of its activities and until 2014, Prof. Eero Tarasti has been the director and leading figure of the Institute.

ISI served as the meeting place for nearly one hundred events, ranging from seminars to summer congresses, plus periodical or occasional meetings of organizations like the Finnish Society of Semiotics, the Musical Signification Project, the International Association for Semiotic Studies and other Nordic and Finno-Ugrian associations. In 1992, Acta Semiotica Fennica, the first ISI book series, started its regular publication of international monographs and anthologies.

In 2014, ISI moved from Imatra to Kaunas (Kaunas University of Technology), Lithuania, under the direction of Prof. Dario Martinelli.

In 2022, ISI moved from Kaunas to Olomouc, Czech Republic, under the direction of Dr. Tyler James Bennett and under the Department of General Linguistics, Palacký University Olomouc.
