= Leonard B. Meyer =

American classical composer

- Born: January 12, 1918; New York City, New York, U.S.
- Died: December 30, 2007 (aged 89); New York City, New York, U.S.
- Education: Columbia University (BA, MA); University of Chicago (PhD)

Leonard B. Meyer (January 12, 1918 – December 30, 2007) was a composer, author, and philosopher. He contributed major works in the fields of aesthetic theory in music, and of compositional analysis.

== Career ==
Meyer studied at Columbia University, where he received a B.A. in Philosophy and an M.A. in Music. He continued at University of Chicago, where he was awarded a Ph.D. in History of Culture in 1954. As a composer, he studied under Stefan Wolpe, Otto Luening, and Aaron Copland. In 1946, he became a member of the music department at the University of Chicago, in 1961 he was appointed professor of music at the University of Chicago and in 1975 professor of music and the humanities at the University of Pennsylvania. He became professor emeritus at Pennsylvania in 1988.

His most influential work, Emotion and Meaning in Music (1956), combined Gestalt Theory and theories by the Pragmatists Charles Sanders Peirce and John Dewey to try to explain the existence of emotion in music. Peirce had suggested that any regular response to an event developed alongside the understanding of that event's consequences, its "meaning". Dewey extended this to explain that if the response was stopped by an unexpected event, then an emotional response would occur over the event's "meaning". Meyer used this basis to form a theory about music, combining musical expectations in a specific cultural context with emotion and meaning elicited. His work went on to influence theorists both in and outside music, as well as providing a basis for cognitive psychology research into music and our responses to it.

Meyer's 1967 work "Music, the Arts, and Ideas," was influential in defining the transition to postmodernism in light of new works such as George Rochberg's Music for the Magic Theater, which was premiered at the University of Chicago in 1967.

Other major written works include The Rhythmic Structure of Music (with Grosvenor Cooper, 1960), Explaining Music (1973), and Style and Music: Theory, History, and Ideology (1989; paperback reprint ed., 1997).

== See also ==
- American philosophy
- List of American philosophers
