= Musical analysis =

Study of musical structure

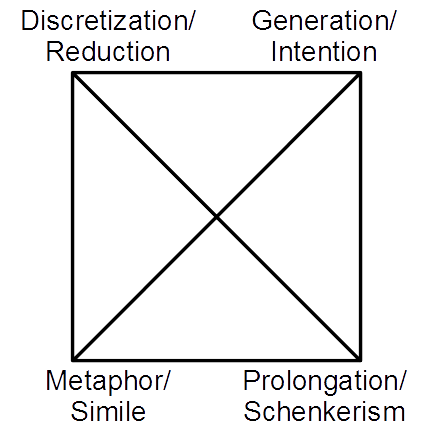
Approaches or techniques to musical analysis. Assumption and advocating could be considered missing.

Musical analysis is the study of musical structure in either compositions or performances. According to music theorist Ian Bent, music analysis "is the means of answering directly the question 'How does it work?'". The method employed to answer this question, and indeed exactly what is meant by the question, differs from analyst to analyst, and according to the purpose of the analysis from a Western framework. According to Bent, "its emergence as an approach and method can be traced back to the 1750s. However it existed as a scholarly tool, albeit an auxiliary one, from the Middle Ages onwards."

The principle of analysis has been variously criticized, especially by composers, such as Edgard Varèse's claim that, "to explain by means of [analysis] is to decompose, to mutilate the spirit of a work".

== Analyses ==
Some analysts, such as Donald Tovey (whose Essays in Musical Analysis are among the most accessible musical analyses) have presented their analyses in prose. Others, such as Hans Keller (who devised a technique he called Functional Analysis) used no prose commentary at all in some of their work.

There have been many notable analysts other than Tovey and Keller. One of the best known and most influential was Heinrich Schenker, who developed Schenkerian analysis, a method that seeks to describe all tonal classical works as elaborations ("prolongations") of a simple contrapuntal sequence. Ernst Kurth coined the term of "developmental motif". Rudolph Réti is notable for tracing the development of small melodic motifs through a work, while Nicolas Ruwet's analysis amounts to a kind of musical semiology.

Musicologists associated with the new musicology often use musical analysis (traditional or not) along with or to support their examinations of the performance practice and social situations in which music is produced and that produce music, and vice versa. Insights from the social considerations may then yield insight into analysis methods.

Edward T. Cone argues that musical analysis lies in between description and prescription. Description consists of simple non-analytical activities such as labeling chords with Roman numerals or tone-rows with integers or row-form, while the other extreme, prescription, consists of "the insistence upon the validity of relationships not supported by the text." Analysis must, rather, provide insight into listening without forcing a description of a piece that cannot be heard.

== Techniques ==
Many techniques are used to analyze music. Metaphor and figurative description may be a part of analysis, and a metaphor used to describe pieces, "reifies their features and relations in a particularly pungent and insightful way: it makes sense of them in ways not formerly possible." Even absolute music may be viewed as a "metaphor for the universe" or nature as "perfect form".

=== Discretization ===
The process of analysis often involves breaking the piece down into relatively simpler and smaller parts. Often, the way these parts fit together and interact with each other is then examined. This process of discretization or segmentation is often considered, as by Jean-Jacques Nattiez, necessary for music to become accessible to analysis. Fred Lerdahl argues that discretization is necessary even for perception by learned listeners, thus making it a basis of his analyses, and finds pieces such as Artikulation by György Ligeti inaccessible, while Rainer Wehinger created a "Hörpartitur" or "score for listening" for the piece, representing different sonorous effects with specific graphic symbols much like a transcription.

=== Composition ===
Analysis often displays a compositional impulse while compositions often "display an analytical impulse" but "though intertextual analyses often succeed through simple verbal description there are good reasons to literally compose the proposed connections. We actually hear how these songs [different musical settings of Goethe's "Nur wer die Sehnsucht kennt"] resonate with one another, comment upon and affect one another ... in a way, the music speaks for itself". This analytic bent is obvious in recent trends in popular music including the mash-ups of various songs.

== Analytical situations ==
Analysis is an activity most often engaged in by musicologists and most often applied to western classical music, although music of non-western cultures and of unnotated oral traditions is also often analysed. An analysis can be conducted on a single piece of music, on a portion or element of a piece or on a collection of pieces. A musicologist's stance is his or her analytical situation. This includes the physical dimension or corpus being studied, the level of stylistic relevance studied, and whether the description provided by the analysis is of its immanent structure, compositional (or poietic) processes, perceptual (or esthesic) processes, all three, or a mixture.

Stylistic levels may be hierarchized as an inverted triangle:

- universals of music
  - system (style) of reference
    - style of a genre or an epoch
      - style of composer X
        - style of a period in the life of a composer
          - work

Nattiez outlines six analytical situations, preferring the sixth::

Poietic processes | Immanent structures of the work | Esthesic processes
1 | ♦
Immanent analysis
2 | ♦ | ← | ♦
Inductive poietics
3 | ♦ | → | ♦
External poietics
4 | ♦ | → | ♦
Inductive esthesics
5 | ♦ | ← | ♦
External esthesics
6 | ♦ | ←→ | ♦ | ←→ | ♦
Communication between the three levels

Examples:

1. "...tackles only the immanent configuration of the work." Allen Forte's musical set theory
2. "...proceed[s] from an analysis of the neutral level to drawing conclusions about the poietic" – Reti analysis of Debussy's La cathédrale engloutie
3. The reverse of the previous, taking "a poietic document—letters, plans, sketches— ... and analyzes the work in the light of this information." Paul Mie, "stylistic analysis of Beethoven in terms of the sketches"
4. The most common, grounded in "perceptive introspection, or in a certain number of general ideas concerning musical perception ... a musicologist ... describes what they think is the listener's perception of the passage",, analysis of measures 9–11 of Bach's C minor fugue in Book I of the Well-Tempered Clavier
5. "Begins with information collected from listeners to attempt to understand how the work has been perceived ... obviously how experimental psychologists would work"
6. "The case in which an immanent analysis is equally relevant to the poietic as to the esthesic." Schenkerian analysis, which, based on the sketches of Beethoven (external poietics) eventually show through analysis how the works must be played and perceived (inductive esthesics)

=== Compositional analysis ===
Jacques Chailley views analysis entirely from a compositional viewpoint, arguing that, "since analysis consists of 'putting oneself in the composer's shoes,' and explaining what he was experiencing as he was writing, it is obvious that we should not think of studying a work in terms of criteria foreign to the author's own preoccupations, no more in tonal analysis than in harmonic analysis."

=== Perceptual analysis ===
On the other hand, Fay argues that, "analytic discussions of music are often concerned with processes that are not immediately perceivable. It may be that the analyst is concerned merely with applying a collection of rules concerning practice, or with the description of the compositional process. But whatever he [or she] aims, he often fails—most notably in twentieth-century music—to illuminate our immediate musical experience," and thus views analysis entirely from a perceptual viewpoint, as does Edward T. Cone, "true analysis works through and for the ear. The greatest analysts are those with the keenest ears; their insights reveal how a piece of music should be heard, which in turn implies how it should be played. An analysis is a direction for performance," and Thomson: "It seems only reasonable to believe that a healthy analytical point of view is that which is so nearly isomorphic with the perceptual act."

=== Analyses of the immanent level ===
Analyses of the immanent level include analyses by Alder, Heinrich Schenker, and the "ontological structuralism" of the analyses of Pierre Boulez, who says in his analysis of The Rite of Spring, "must I repeat here that I have not pretended to discover a creative process, but concern myself with the result, whose only tangibles are mathematical relationships? If I have been able to find all these structural characteristics, it is because they are there, and I don't care whether they were put there consciously or unconsciously, or with what degree of acuteness they informed [the composer's] understanding of his conception; I care very little for all such interaction between the work and 'genius'."

Again, Nattiez argues that the above three approaches, by themselves, are necessarily incomplete and that an analysis of all three levels is required. Jean Molino shows that musical analysis shifted from an emphasis upon the poietic vantage point to an esthesic one at the beginning of the eighteenth century.

=== Nonformalized analyses ===
Nattiez distinguishes between nonformalized and formalized analyses. Nonformalized analyses, apart from musical and analytical terms, do not use resources or techniques other than language. He further distinguishes nonformalized analyses between impressionistic, paraphrases, or hermeneutic readings of the text (explications de texte). Impressionistic analyses are in "a more or less high-literary style, proceeding from an initial selection of elements deemed characteristic," such as the following description of the opening of Claude Debussy's Prelude to the Afternoon of a Faun: "The alternation of binary and ternary divisions of the eighth notes, the sly feints made by the three pauses, soften the phrase so much, render it so fluid, that it escapes all arithmetical rigors. It floats between heaven and earth like a Gregorian chant; it glides over signposts marking traditional divisions; it slips so furtively between various keys that it frees itself effortlessly from their grasp, and one must await the first appearance of a harmonic underpinning before the melody takes graceful leave of this causal atonality".

Paraphrases are a "respeaking" in plain words of the events of the text with little interpretation or addition, such as the following description of the "Bourée" of Bach's Third Suite: "An anacrusis, an initial phrase in D major. The figure marked (a) is immediately repeated, descending through a third, and it is employed throughout the piece. This phrase is immediately elided into its consequent, which modulates from D to A major. This figure (a) is used again two times, higher each time; this section is repeated."

"Hermeneutic reading of a musical text is based on a description, a 'naming' of the melody's elements, but adds to it a hermeneutic and phenomenological depth that, in the hands of a talented writer, can result in genuine interpretive masterworks.... All the illustrations in Abraham's and Dahlhaus's Melodielehre (1972) are historical in character; Rosen's essays in The Classical Style (1971) seek to grasp the essence of an epoch's style; Meyer's analysis of Beethoven's Farewell Sonata penetrates melody from the vantage point of perceived structures." He gives as a last example the following description of Franz Schubert's Unfinished Symphony: "The transition from first to second subject is always a difficult piece of musical draughtsmanship; and in the rare cases where Schubert accomplishes it with smoothness, the effort otherwise exhausts him to the verge of dullness (as in the slow movement of the otherwise great A minor Quartet). Hence, in his most inspired works the transition is accomplished by an abrupt coup de théâtre; and of all such coups, no doubt the crudest is that in the Unfinished Symphony. Very well then; here is a new thing in the history of the symphony, not more new, not more simple than the new things which turned up in each of Beethoven's nine. Never mind its historic origin, take it on its merits. Is it not a most impressive moment?".

=== Formalized analyses ===
Formalized analyses propose models for melodic functions or simulate music. Meyer distinguishes between global models, which "provide an image of the whole corpus being studied, by listing characteristics, classifying phenomena, or both; they furnish statistical evaluation," and linear models which "do not try to reconstitute the whole melody in order of real time succession of melodic events. Linear models ... describe a corpus by means of a system of rules encompassing not only the hierarchical organization of the melody, but also the distribution, environment, and context of events, examples including the explanation of 'succession of pitches in New Guinean chants in terms of distributional constraints governing each melodic interval' by Chenoweth the transformational analysis by Herndon, and the 'grammar for the soprano part in Bach's chorales [which,] when tested by computer ... allows us to generate melodies in Bach's style' by Baroni and Jacoboni.

Global models are further distinguished as analysis by traits, which "identify the presence or absence of a particular variable, and makes a collective image of the song, genre, or style being considered by means of a table, or classificatory analysis, which sorts phenomena into classes," one example being "trait listing" by Helen Roberts, and classificatory analysis, which "sorts phenomena into classes," examples being the universal system for classifying melodic contours by Kolinski. Classificatory analyses often call themselves taxonomical. "Making the basis for the analysis explicit is a fundamental criterion in this approach, so delimiting units is always accompanied by carefully defining units in terms of their constituent variables."

=== Intermediary analyses ===
Nattiez lastly proposes intermediary models "between reductive formal precision, and impressionist laxity." These include Schenker, Meyer (classification of melodic structure), Narmour, and Lerdahl-Jackendoff's "use of graphics without appealing to a system of formalized rules," complementing and not replacing the verbal analyses. These are in contrast to the formalized models of Milton Babbitt and Boretz. According to Nattiez, Boretz "seems to be confusing his own formal, logical model with an immanent essence he then ascribes to music," and Babbitt "defines a musical theory as a hypothetical-deductive system ... but if we look closely at what he says, we quickly realize that the theory also seeks to legitimize a music yet to come; that is, that it is also normative ... transforming the value of the theory into an aesthetic norm ... from an anthropological standpoint, that is a risk that is difficult to countenance." Similarly, "Boretz enthusiastically embraces logical formalism, while evading the question of knowing how the data—whose formalization he proposes—have been obtained".

== Divergent analyses ==
Typically a given work is analyzed by more than one person and different or divergent analyses are created. For instance, the first two bars of the prelude to Claude Debussy's Pelléas et Mélisande:

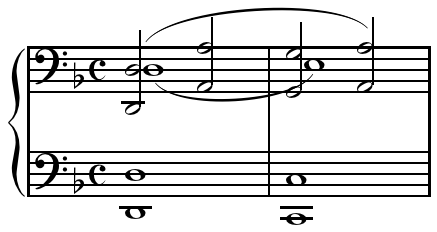
Debussy Pelléas et Mélisande prelude opening

are analyzed differently by Leibowitz Laloy, van Appledorn, and Christ. Leibowitz analyses this succession harmonically as D minor:I–VII–V, ignoring melodic motion, Laloy analyses the succession as D:I–V, seeing the G in the second measure as an ornament, and both van Appledorn and Christ analyses the succession as D:I–VII.

Nattiez argues that this divergence is due to the analysts' respective analytic situations, and to what he calls transcendent principles (1997b: 853, what George Holton might call "themata"), the "philosophical project[s]", "underlying principles", or a prioris of analyses, one example being Nattiez's use of the tripartitional definition of sign, and what, after epistemological historian Paul Veyne, he calls plots.

Van Appledorn sees the succession as D:I–VII so as to allow the interpretation of the first chord in measure five, which Laloy sees as a dominant seventh on D (V/IV) with a diminished fifth (despite that the IV doesn't arrive till measure twelve), while van Appledorn sees it as a French sixth on D, D–F♯–A♭–[C] in the usual second inversion. This means that D is the second degree and the required reference to the first degree, C, being established by the D:VII or C major chord. "The need to explain the chord in measure five establishes that C–E–G is 'equally important' as the D–(F)–A of measure one." Leibowitz gives only the bass for chord, E indicating the progression I–II an "unreal" progression in keeping with his "dialectic between the real and the unreal" used in the analysis, while Christ explains the chord as an augmented eleventh with a bass of B♭, interpreting it as a traditional tertian extended chord.

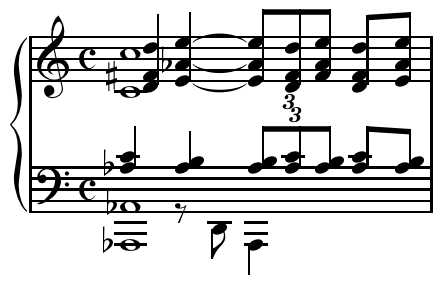
Debussy's Pélleas et Mélisande prelude, measures 5–6

Not only does an analyst select particular traits, they arrange them according to a plot [intrigue].... Our sense of the component parts of a musical work, like our sense of historical 'facts,' is mediated by lived experience." (176)

While John Blacking, among others, holds that "there is ultimately only one explanation and ... this could be discovered by a context-sensitive analysis of the music in culture," according to Nattiez and others, "there is never only one valid musical analysis for any given work." Blacking gives as example: "everyone disagrees hotly and stakes his [or her] academic reputation on what Mozart really meant in this or that bar of his symphonies, concertos, or quartets. If we knew exactly what went on inside Mozart's mind when he wrote them, there could be only one explanation". (93) However, Nattiez points out that even if we could determine "what Mozart was thinking" we would still be lacking an analysis of the neutral and esthesic levels.

Roger Scruton, in a review of Nattiez's Fondements, says one may, "describe it as you like so long as you hear it correctly ... certain descriptions suggest wrong ways of hearing it ... what is obvious to hear [in Pélleas et Mélisande] is the contrast in mood and atmosphere between the 'modal' passage and the bars which follow it." Nattiez counters that if compositional intent were identical to perception, "historians of musical language could take a permanent nap.... Scruton sets himself up as a universal, absolute conscience for the 'right' perception of the Pélleas et Mélisande. But hearing is an active symbolic process (which must be explained): nothing in perception is self-evident."

Thus Nattiez suggests that analyses, especially those intending "a semiological orientation, should ... at least include a comparative critique of already-written analyses, when they exist, so as to explain why the work has taken on this or that image constructed by this or that writer: all analysis is a representation; [and] an explanation of the analytical criteria used in the new analysis, so that any critique of this new analysis could be situated in relation to that analysis's own objectives and methods. As Jean-Claude Gardin so rightly remarks, 'no physicist, no biologist is surprised when asked to indicate, in the context of a new theory, the physical data and the mental operations that led to its formulation'. Making one's procedures explicit would help to create a cumulative progress in knowledge." (177)

== See also ==
- List of music software § Music analysis software
- Schenkerian analysis
