= Dal segno =

Musical term meaning "from the sign"

Segno

A contrived example showing D.S. al fine. Use of Dal Segno eliminates the need to write out extra measures, often many more than in this example. The notes are to be played in this order: G A B B C' A B B C' C. The MIDI file plays in the order: G A B B C' A B C' C.

A similar example showing D.S. al CODA. The notes are to be played in this order: G A B B C' A B C

In music notation, dal segno (UK: /dæl ˈsɛnjoʊ/, US: /dɑːl ˈseɪnjoʊ/, Italian: [dal ˈseɲɲo]), abbreviated D.S., is a direction to the musician to repeat some of the piece. It means "from the sign" in Italian, the sign being a symbol printed on the sheet music. The abbreviation D.S. appears on the music sheet at the point where the musician must repeat a passage. At another point on the music sheet, the sign (shown at right) indicates the passage to repeat. The sign is called the segno in English.

When music is being read and there is a segno at the top of a measure, the musician continues playing without acting upon it except to remember where it is. It alerts the musician to expect a D.S. later in the piece. Likewise, if there is a fine or coda symbol printed at the top of a measure, it is ignored until a subsequent D.S. al fine or D.S. al coda instructs the musician to use those notations.

== Variants ==
The three main variants are:

- D.S. instructs the musician to go back to the sign and continue playing. The next time the D.S. is encountered, it should be passed over without action.
- D.S. al coda instructs the musician to go back to the sign, and when Al coda or To coda is reached, immediately go to the coda symbol.
- D.S. al fine instructs the musician to go back to the sign and play until reaching the measure marked fine, meaning end.

The Sibelius 5 Reference manual had the following description:

The Italian term 'dal segno' literally means 'from the sign.' In most music you will see either D.S. al Fine (which means 'go back to the 𝄋 sign and play the music again until you come to the bar marked Fine, then stop') or D.S. al Coda (which means 'go back to the 𝄋 sign and play the music again until you come to the bar marked To Coda, then jump to the coda'). ...You may also see simply...D.S. in the final bar of a score, which means to repeat from...the 𝄋 sign...then stop at the end. In music, these instructions always appear at the end of the bar from which you have to jump back (either to the 𝄋 sign or to the start of the piece).

Al segno indicates that the player should go to the sign: Da capo al segno (D.C. al Segno), "From the beginning to the sign (𝄋)."

In operas of the 18th century, a dal segno aria was a common alternative to a da capo aria, which began with an opening ritornello, and which was then omitted in the repeat (the sign being placed after the ritornello).

== Encoding ==
The segno sign is encoded in the Musical Symbols block of Unicode as U+1D10B 𝄋 MUSICAL SYMBOL SEGNO.

== See also ==
- Coda
- Da capo
- Fermata
- Repeat sign
