= Jean Molino =

Swiss semiologist

Jean Molino is professeur ordinaire at the University of Lausanne and a semiologist. His former students include Jean-Jacques Nattiez.

== Bibliography ==
- Musical Fact and the Semiology of Music, trans. J. A. Underwood, Music Analysis 9/2 (July 1990): 113–156.
- Saavedra, Rafael: “El dilema de la interpretación musical: una reflexión semiótica desde el modelo tripartito de Molino y Nattiez” en Revista música en clave, Sociedad Venezolana de Musicología, Vol. 8 – 1, Enero-Abril (2014).
