= Jean-Jacques Nattiez =

French-Canadian musicologist and ethnomusicologist (born 1945)

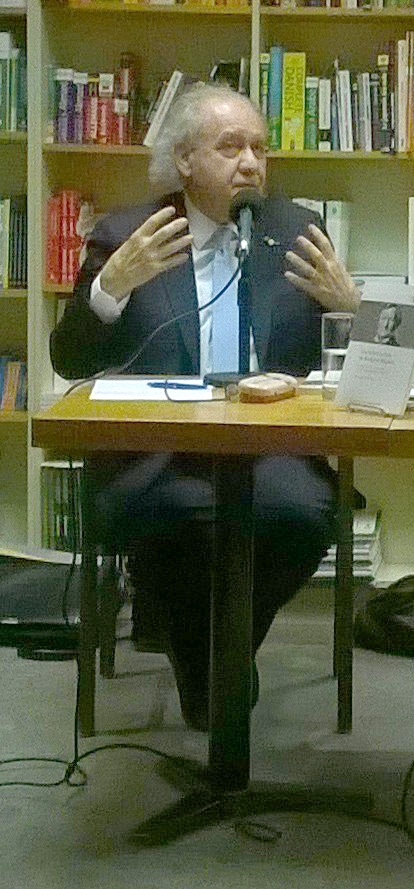
- Jean-Jacques Nattiez photographed in 2018 in Montréal, Québec, Canada at the Olivieri Bookstore
- Born: 30 December 1945 (age 80); Amiens, Paris, France

Academic background
- Education: Aix-Marseille University; Sorbonne University
- Doctoral advisor: Nicolas Ruwet

Academic work
- Discipline: Music semiology
- Institutions: Université de Montréal

Jean-Jacques Nattiez OC CQ FRSC (French: [natje]; born December 30, 1945) is a French musicologist and ethnomusicologist active in Canada, who is a central figure in music semiology. He has been a Professor of musicology at the Université de Montréal since 1972.

== Life and career ==
Jean-Jacques Nattiez was born on December 30, 1945, in Amiens, France. He studied semiology with Georges Mounin and Jean Molino and music semiology (doctoral) with Nicolas Ruwet.

He is a noted specialist on the writings of the composer and conductor Pierre Boulez.

In 1990, he was made a Member of the Order of Canada. In 2001, he was made a Knight of the National Order of Quebec.

== Awards ==
- 1988, Dent Medal of the Royal Musical Association
- 1989, Prix André-Laurendeau pour les sciences humaines from the Association canadienne française pour l'avancement des sciences
- 1990, Molson Prize from the Canada Council
- 1994, prix Léon-Gérin pour les sciences sociales du Gouvernement du Québec
- 1996, Fumio Koizumi Prize for Ethnomusicology, Tokyo, Japan
- 2004, the Killam Prize by the Canada Council for the Arts
- In 2011, he was promoted to Officer of the Order of Canada "for his contributions to the development of musicology as a researcher, professor and specialist of music semiotics".

== Selected publications ==
- Proust as Musician. Translated by Derrick Puffett. Cambridge, 1989.
- Music and Discourse: Toward a Semiology of Music (Musicologie générale et sémiologue, 1987). Translated by Carolyn Abbate (1990). ISBN 0-691-02714-5.
- Wagner Androgyne: A Study in Interpretation. Translated by Stewart Spencer. Princeton University Press, 1993. ISBN 0-691-04832-0 (pbk).

== See also ==
- Esthesic and poietic
- Trace
