= Song structure =

Arrangement of a song, part of the songwriting process

Song structure is the arrangement of a song, and is a part of the songwriting process. It is typically sectional, which uses repeating forms in songs. Common piece-level musical forms for vocal music include bar form, 32-bar form, verse–chorus form, ternary form, strophic form, and the 12-bar blues. Popular music songs traditionally use the same music for each verse or stanza of lyrics (as opposed to songs that are "through-composed"—an approach used in classical music art songs). Pop and traditional forms can be used even with songs that have structural differences in melodies. The most common format in modern popular music is introduction (intro), verse, pre-chorus, chorus, verse, pre-chorus, chorus, bridge, and chorus, with an optional outro. In rock music styles, notably heavy metal music, there are usually one or more guitar solos in the song, often found after the middle chorus part. In pop music, there may be a guitar solo, or a solo performed with another instrument such as a synthesizer or a saxophone.

The foundation of popular music is the "verse" and "chorus" structure. Some writers use a simple "verse, hook, verse, hook, bridge, hook" method. Pop and rock songs nearly always have both a verse and a chorus. The primary difference between the two is that when the music of the verse returns, it is almost always given a new set of lyrics, whereas the chorus usually retains the same set of lyrics every time its music appears." Both are essential elements, with the verse usually played first (exceptions include "She Loves You" by The Beatles, an early example in the rock music genre). Each verse usually employs the same melody (possibly with some slight modifications), while the lyrics usually change for each verse. The chorus (or "refrain") usually consists of a melodic and lyrical phrase that repeats. Pop songs may have an introduction and coda ("tag"), but these elements are not essential to the identity of most songs. Pop songs often connect the verse and chorus via a pre-chorus, with a bridge section usually appearing after the second chorus.

The verse, chorus and pre-chorus are usually repeated throughout a song, while the intro, bridge, and coda (also called an "outro") are usually only used once. Sometimes a post-chorus will be present on a song. Some pop songs may have a solo section, particularly in rock or blues-influenced pop. During the solo section, one or more instruments play a melodic line which may be the melody used by the singer, or, in blues or jazz improvised.

== Verse–chorus form ==
Verse–chorus form consists of two main sections – a verse and chorus – that often contrast melodically, rhythmically, harmonically and dynamically. Songs in verse–chorus form may also include introductory, transitional and concluding sections.

=== Introduction ===
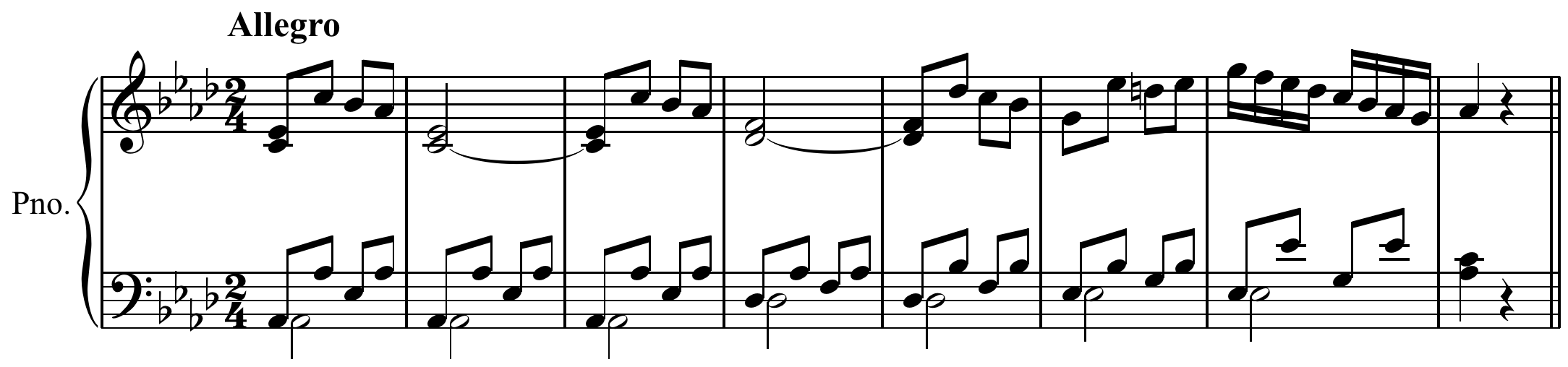
"Jingle Bells"'s introduction or full song Structure: Intro, Verse I, Chorus, Verse II, Chorus, Verse III, Chorus, Verse IV, Chorus, Outro.

The introduction is a unique section that comes at the beginning of the piece. Generally speaking, an introduction contains just music and no words. It usually builds up suspense for the listener so when the downbeat drops in, it creates a pleasing sense of release. The intro also creates the atmosphere of the song. As such, the rhythm section typically plays in the "feel" of the song that follows. For example, for a blues shuffle, a band starts playing a shuffle rhythm. In some songs, the intro is one or more bars of the tonic chord (the "home" key of the song). With songs, another role of the intro is to give the singer the key of the song. For this reason, even if an intro includes chords other than the tonic, it generally ends with a cadence, either on the tonic or dominant chord.

The introduction may also be based around the chords used in the verse, chorus, or bridge, or a stock "turnaround" progression may be played, such as the I–vi–ii–V progression (particularly in jazz influenced pop songs). More rarely, the introduction may begin by suggesting or implying another key. For example, a song in C Major might begin with an introduction in G Major, which makes the listener think that the song will eventually be in G Major. A cliche used to indicate to the listener that this G Major section is in fact the dominant chord of another key area is to add the dominant seventh, which in this case would shift the harmony to a G^{7} chord. In some cases, an introduction contains only drums or percussion parts that set the rhythm and "groove" for the song. Alternately the introduction may consist of a solo section sung by the lead singer (or a group of backup singers), or a riff played by an instrumentalist.

The most straightforward, and least risky way to write an introduction is to use a section from the song. This contains melodic themes from the song, chords from one of the song's sections, and the beat and style of the song. However, not all songs have an intro of this type. Some songs have an intro that does not use any of the material from the song that is to follow. With this type of intro, the goal is to create interest in the listener and make them unsure of what will happen. This type of intro could consist of a series of loud, accented chords, punctuated by cymbal, with a bassline beginning near the end, to act as a pitch reference point for the singer.

=== Verse ===
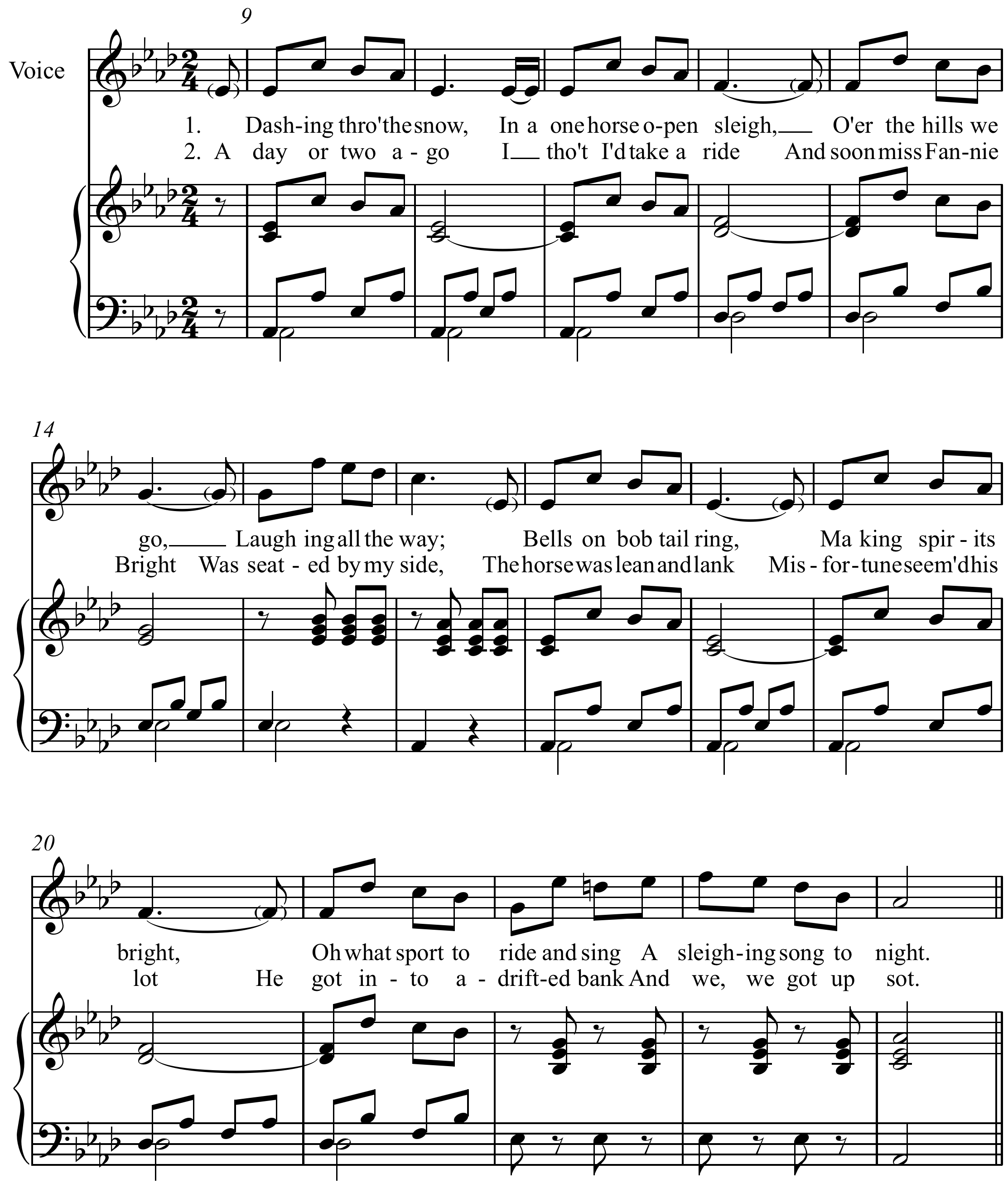
"Jingle Bells"'s verse or full song

In popular music, a verse roughly corresponds to a poetic stanza because it consists of rhyming lyrics most often with an AABB or ABAB rhyme scheme. When two or more sections of the song have almost identical music but different lyrics, each section is considered one verse.

Musically, "the verse is to be understood as a unit that prolongs the tonic....The musical structure of the verse nearly always recurs at least once with a different set of lyrics." The tonic or "home key" chord of a song can be prolonged in a number of ways. Pop and rock songs often use chords closely related to the tonic, such as iii or vi, to prolong the tonic. In the key of C Major, the iii chord would be E Minor and the vi chord would be A Minor. These chords are considered closely related to the tonic because they share chord tones. For example, the chord E Minor includes the notes E and G, both of which are part of the C Major triad. Similarly, the chord A Minor includes the notes C and E, both part of the C Major triad.

Lyrically, "the verse contains the details of the song: the story, the events, images and emotions that the writer wishes to express....Each verse will have different lyrics from the others." "A verse exists primarily to support the chorus or refrain...both musically and lyrically." A verse of a song, is a repeated sung melody where the words change from use to use (though not necessarily a great deal).

=== Pre-chorus ===
An optional section that may occur after the verse is the pre-chorus. Also known as a "build", "channel", or "transitional bridge", the pre-chorus functions to connect the verse to the chorus with intermediary material, typically using subdominant (usually built on the IV chord or ii chord, which in the key of C Major would be an F Major or D minor chord) or similar transitional harmonies. "Often, a two-phrase verse containing basic chords is followed by a passage, often harmonically probing, that leads to the full chorus." Often, when verse and chorus use the same harmonic structure, the pre-chorus introduces a new harmonic pattern or harmony that prepares the verse chords to transition into the chorus.

For example, if a song is set in C Major, and the songwriter aims to get to a chorus that focuses on the dominant chord (G Major) being tonicized (treated like a "home key" for a short period), a chord progression could be used for the pre-chorus that gets the listener ready to hear the chorus' chord (G Major) as an arrival key. One widely used way to accomplish this is to precede the G Major chord with its own ii–V^{7} chords. In the key given, ii of G Major would be an A minor chord. V^{7} of G Major would be D^{7}. As such, with the example song, this could be done by having a pre-chorus that consists of one bar of A minor and one bar of D^{7}. This would allow the listener to expect a resolution from ii–V to I, which in this case is the temporary tonic of G Major. The chord A minor would not be unusual to the listener, as it is a shared chord that exists in both G Major and C Major. A minor is the ii chord in G Major, and it is the vi chord in C Major. The chord that would alert the listener that a change was taking place is the D^{7} chord. There is no D^{7} chord in C Major. A listener experienced with popular and traditional music would hear this as a secondary dominant. Harmonic theorists and arrangers would call it V^{7}/V or five of five, as the D^{7} chord is the dominant (or fifth) chord of G Major.

=== Chorus or refrain ===
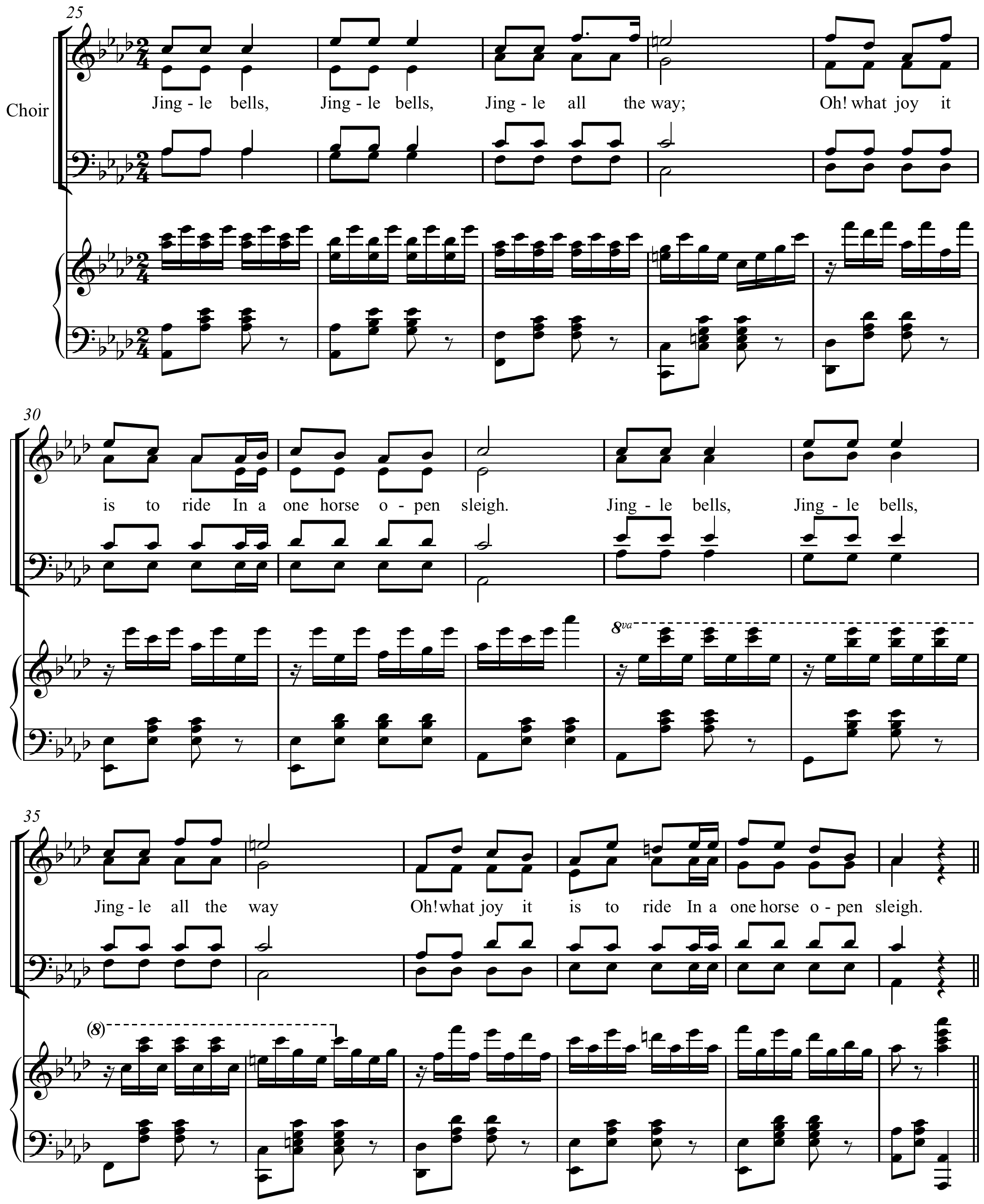
"Jingle Bells"'s chorus or full song

The terms chorus and refrain are often used interchangeably, both referring to a recurring part of a song. When a distinction is made, the chorus is the part that contains the hook or the "main idea" of a song's lyrics and music, and there is rarely variation from one repetition of the chorus to the next. A refrain is a repetitive phrase or phrases that serve the function of a chorus lyrically, but are not in a separate section or long enough to be a chorus. For example, refrains are found in the Beatles' "She Loves You" ("yeah, yeah, yeah"), AC/DC's "You Shook Me All Night Long", Simon & Garfunkel's "The Sound of Silence", and "Deck the Halls" ("fa la la la la").

The chorus or refrain is the element of the song that repeats at least once both musically and lyrically. It is always of greater musical and emotional intensity than the verse. "The chorus, which gets its name from a usual thickening of texture from the addition of backing vocals, is always a discrete section that nearly always prolongs the tonic and carries an unvaried poetic text." In terms of narrative, the chorus conveys the main message or theme of the song. Normally the most memorable element of the song for listeners, the chorus usually contains the hook.

The degree to which a chorus is differentiated from other sections can also vary between musical styles. A 2026 musicological study comparing Taylor Swift's earlier pop albums Fearless and Lover with the indie-folk-influenced Folklore and Evermore found that the latter feature fewer conventional chorus markers, including dynamic contrasts, preparatory transitions, and prominent lyrical hooks. The study suggests that prototype-based approaches to song form can help describe such stylistic differences without requiring all choruses to share the same formal characteristics.

=== Post-chorus ===
An optional section that may occur after the chorus is the post-chorus (or postchorus). The term can be used generically for any section that comes after a chorus, but more often refers to a section that has similar character to the chorus, but is distinguishable in close analysis. The concept of a post-chorus has been particularly popularized and analyzed by music theorist Asaf Peres, who is followed in this section.

Characterizations of post-chorus vary, but are broadly classed into simply a second chorus (in Peres's terms, a detached postchorus) or an extension of the chorus (in Peres's terms, an attached postchorus). Some restrict "post-chorus" to only cases where it is an extension of a chorus (attached postchorus), and do not consider the second part of two-part choruses (detached postchorus) as being a "post"-chorus.

As with distinguishing the pre-chorus from a verse, it can be difficult to distinguish the post-chorus from the chorus. In some cases they appear separately – for example, the post-chorus only appears after the second and third chorus, but not the first – and thus are clearly distinguishable. In other cases they always appear together, and thus a "chorus + post-chorus" can be considered a subdivision of the overall chorus, rather than an independent section.

Characterization of a post-chorus varies, beyond "comes immediately after the chorus"; Peres characterizes it by two conditions: it maintains or increases sonic energy, otherwise it is a bridge or verse; and contains a melodic hook (vocal or instrumental), otherwise it is a transition.

Detached post-choruses typically have distinct melody and lyrics from the chorus:

- "Chandelier" (Sia, 2014): the chorus begins and ends with "I'm gonna swing from the chandelier / From the chandelier", while the post-chorus repeats instead "holding on", in "I'm holding on for dear life" and "I'm just holding on for tonight", and has a new melody, but the same chord progression as the chorus.
- "The Boys Are Back in Town" (Thin Lizzy, 1976): the chorus consists of the phrase "the boys are back in town", repeated in a call-and-response style, while the post-chorus features a prominent riff by two lead guitars.
- "Smells Like Teen Spirit" (Nirvana, 1991): the chorus lasts from "With the lights out, it's less dangerous" to "A mosquito, my libido", while the post-chorus features a heavy riff with the vocals "hey, yay".

Lyrics of attached post-choruses typically repeat the hook/refrain from the chorus, with little additional content, often using vocables like "ah" or "oh". Examples include:

- "Umbrella" (Rihanna, 2007): the chorus begins "When the sun shine, we shine together" and run through "You can stand under my umbrella / You can stand under my umbrella, ella, ella, eh, eh, eh", which is followed by three more repetitions of "Under my umbrella, ella, ella, eh, eh, eh", the last one adding another "eh, eh-eh". Here the division between chorus and post-chorus is blurred, as the "ella, ella" begins in the chorus, and was a play on the reverb effect.
- "Shape of You" (Ed Sheeran, 2017): the chorus runs "I'm in love with the shape of you ... Every day discovering something brand new / I'm in love with your body", and the post-chorus repeats vocables and the hook "Oh—I—oh—I—oh—I—oh—I / I'm in love with your body", then repeats the end of the chorus, switching "your body" to "the shape of you": "Every day discovering something brand new / I'm in love with the shape of you"
- "Girls Like You" (Maroon 5, 2018): the chorus runs "'Cause girls like you ... I need a girl like you, yeah, yeah ... I need a girl like you, yeah, yeah", and the post-chorus repeats the hook with added "yeah"s: "Yeah, yeah, yeah, yeah, yeah, yeah / I need a girl like you, yeah, yeah / Yeah yeah yeah, yeah, yeah, yeah / I need a girl like you".

Hybrids are also common (Peres: hybrid postchorus), where the post-chorus keeps the hook from the chorus (like an attached postchorus), but introduces some additional content (hook or melody, like a detached postchorus.

=== Bridge ===
A bridge may be a transition, but in popular music, it more often is "...a section that contrasts with the verse...[,] usually ends on the dominant...[,] [and] often culminates in a strong re-transitional." "The bridge is a device that is used to break up the repetitive pattern of the song and keep the listener's attention....In a bridge, the pattern of the words and music change." For example, John Denver's "Country Roads" is a song with a bridge while Stevie Wonder's "You Are the Sunshine of My Life" is a song without one.

In music theory, "middle eight" (a common type of bridge) refers to a section of a song with a significantly different melody and lyrics, which helps the song develop itself in a natural way by creating a contrast to the previously played, usually placed after the second chorus in a song.

A song employing a middle eight might look like:

       ....  ....    ....  ....    ........  ....     ....
Intro-{Verse-Pre-Chorus-Chorus}{Verse-Pre-Chorus-Chorus}-Middle 8-{Chorus}

By adding a powerful upbeat middle eight, musicians can then end the song with a hook in the end chorus and finale.

=== Conclusion or outro ===
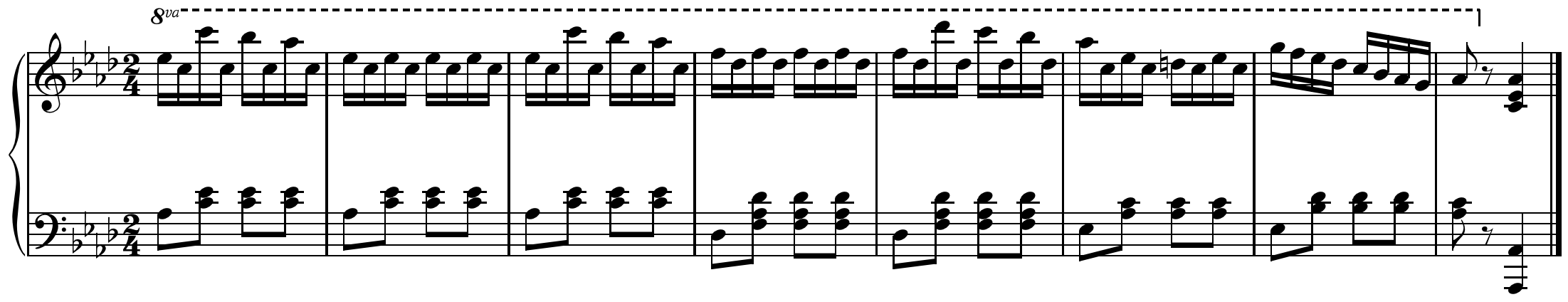
"Jingle Bells"'s outro or full song

The conclusion or (in popular-music terminology) outro of a song is a way of finishing or completing the song. It signals to the listeners that the song is nearing its close. The reason for having an outro is that if a song just ended at the last bar of a section, such as on the last verse or the last chorus, this might feel too abrupt for listeners. By using an outro, the songwriter signals that the song is, in fact, nearing its end. This gives the listeners a good sense of closure. For DJs, the outro is a signal that they need to be ready to mix in their next song.

In general, songwriters and arrangers do not introduce any new melodies or riffs in the outro. However, a melody or riff used throughout the song may be re-used as part of an outro. Generally, the outro is a section where the energy of the song, broadly defined, dissipates. For example, many songs end with a fade-out, in which the song gets quieter and quieter. In many songs, the band does a ritardando during the outro, a process of gradually slowing down the tempo. Both the fade-out and the ritardando are ways of decreasing the intensity of a song and signalling that it is nearing its conclusion.

For an outro that fades out, the arranger or songwriter typically repeats a short section of the music over and over. This can be the chorus, for example. An audio engineer then uses the fader on the mixing board to gradually decrease the volume of the recording. When a band, especially a tribute band, plays a cover song that, in the recorded version, ended with a fade-out, the live band might simulate that by playing progressively quieter. However, the live band will more likely invent an instrumental ending to definitively finish the song, which may be some standard closing cadence or perhaps a coda specifically patterned after the song's refrain.

Besides fading out, another way some pop and rock songs may end is with a tag. There are two types of tags: the instrumental tag and the instrumental/vocal tag. With an instrumental tag, the vocalist no longer sings, and the band's rhythm section takes over the music to finish off the song. A tag is often a vamp of a few chords that the band repeats. In a jazz song, this could be a standard turnaround, such as I–vi–ii–V^{7} or a stock progression, such as ii–V^{7}. If the tag includes the tonic chord, such as a vamp on I–IV, the bandleader typically cues the last time that the penultimate chord (a IV chord in this case) is played, leading to an ending on the I chord. If the tag does not include the tonic chord, such as with a ii–V^{7} tag, the bandleader cues the band to do a cadence that resolves onto the tonic (I) chord. With an instrumental and vocal tag, the band and vocalist typically repeat a section of the song, such as the chorus, to give emphasis to its message. In some cases, the vocalist may use only a few words from the chorus or even one word. Some bands have the guitar player do a guitar solo during the outro, but it is not the focus of the section; instead, it is more to add interesting improvisation. A guitar solo during an outro is typically mixed lower than a mid-song guitar solo.

=== Elision ===
An elision is a section of music where different sections overlap one another, usually for a short period. It is mostly used in fast-paced music, and it is designed to create tension and drama. Songwriters use elision to keep the song from losing its energy during cadences, the points at which the music comes to rest on, typically on a tonic or dominant chord. If a song has a section that ends with a cadence on the tonic, if the songwriter gives this cadence a full bar, with the chord held as a whole note, this makes the listener feel like the music is stopping. However, if songwriters use an elided cadence, they can bring the section to a cadence on the tonic, and then, immediately after this cadence, begin a new section of music which overlaps with the cadence. Another form of elision would, in a chorus later in the song, to interject musical elements from the bridge.

=== Instrumental solo ===
A solo is a section designed to showcase an instrumentalist (e.g. a guitarist or a harmonica player) or less commonly, more than one instrumentalist (e.g., a trumpeter and a sax player). Guitar solos are common in rock music, particularly heavy metal and in the blues. The solo section may take place over the chords from the verse, chorus, or bridge, or over a standard solo backing progression, such as the 12-bar blues progression. In some pop songs, the solo performer plays the same melodies that were performed by the lead singer, often with flourishes and embellishments, such as riffs, scale runs, and arpeggios. In blues- or jazz-influenced pop songs, the solo performers may improvise a solo.

=== Ad lib ===
An ad lib section of a song (usually in the coda or outro) occurs when the main lead vocal or a second lead vocal breaks away from the already established lyric and/or melody to add melodic interest and intensity to the end of the song. Often, the ad lib repeats the previously sung line using variations on phrasing, melodic shape, and/or lyric, but the vocalist may also use entirely new lyrics or a lyric from an earlier section of the song. During an ad lib section, the rhythm may become freer (with the rhythm section following the vocalist), or the rhythm section may stop entirely, giving the vocalist the freedom to use whichever tempo sounds right. During live performances, singers sometimes include ad libs not originally in the song, such as making a reference to the town of the audience or customizing the lyrics to the current events of the era.

There is a distinction between ad lib as a song section and ad lib as a general term. Ad lib as a general term can be applied to any free interpretation of the musical material.

== AABA form ==
Thirty-two-bar form uses four sections, most often eight measures long each (4×8=32), two verses or A sections, a contrasting B section (the bridge or "middle-eight") and a return of the verse in one last A section (AABA). The B section is often intended as a contrast to the A sections that precede and follow it. The B section may be made to contrast by putting it in a new harmony. For example, with the jazz standard "I Got Rhythm", the A sections are all tonic prolongations based around the I–vi–ii–V chord progression (B♭ in the standard key); however, the B section changes key and moves to V/vi, or D^{7} in the standard key, which then does a circle of fifths movement to G^{7}, C^{7} and finally F^{7}, setting the listener up for a return to the tonic Bb in the final A section.

The "I Got Rhythm" example also provides contrast because the harmonic rhythm changes in the B section. Whereas the A sections contain a vibrant, exciting feel of two chord changes per bar (e.g., the first two bars are often B♭–g minor/c minor–F^{7}), the B section consists of two bars of D^{7}, two bars of G^{7}, two bars of C^{7} and two bars of F^{7}. In some songs, the "feel" also changes in the B section. For example, the A sections may be in swing feel, and the B section may be in Latin or Afro-Cuban feel.

While the form is often described as AABA, this does not mean that the A sections are all exactly the same. The first A section ends by going back to the next A section, and the second A section ends and transitions into the B section. As such, at the minimum, the composer or arranger often modifies the harmony of the end of the different A sections to guide the listener through the key changes. As well, the composer or arranger may re-harmonize the melody on one or more of the A sections, to provide variety. Note that with a reharmonization, the melody does not usually change; only the chords played by the accompaniment musicians change.

Examples include "Deck the Halls":

A: Deck the hall with boughs of holly,
A: 'Tis the season to be jolly.
B: Don we now our gay apparel,
A: Troll the ancient Yuletide carol.

== Variation on the basic structure ==
Verse-chorus form or ABA form may be combined with AABA form, in compound AABA forms. That means that every A section or B section can consist of more than one section (for example Verse-Chorus). In that way the modern popular song structure can be viewed as a AABA form, where the B is the bridge.

AAA format may be found in Bob Dylan's "The Times They Are a-Changin'", and songs like "The House of the Rising Sun", and "Clementine". Also "Old MacDonald", "Amazing Grace", "The Thrill Is Gone", and Gordon Lightfoot's "The Wreck of the Edmund Fitzgerald".

AABA may be found in Crystal Gayle's "Don't It Make My Brown Eyes Blue", Billy Joel's "Just the Way You Are", and The Beatles' "Yesterday".

ABA (verse/chorus or chorus/verse) format may be found in Pete Seeger's "Turn! Turn! Turn!" (chorus first) and The Rolling Stones's "Honky Tonk Woman" (verse first).

ABAB may be found in AC/DC's "Back in Black", Jimmy Buffett's "Margaritaville", The Archies's "Sugar, Sugar", and The Eagles's "Hotel California".

ABABCB format may be found in John Cougar Mellencamp's "Hurts So Good", Tina Turner's "What's Love Got to Do with It?", and ZZ Top's "Sharp Dressed Man". Variations include Smokey Robinson's "My Guy", The Beatles's "Ticket to Ride", The Pretenders' "Back on the Chain Gang" (ABABCAB), Poison's "Every Rose Has Its Thorn" (ABABCBAB), and Billy Joel's "It's Still Rock and Roll to Me" (ABABCABCAB).

== See also ==
- Earworm
- Lick
- Ostinato
- Subject
- Vamp
