= Piano Sonata No. 5 (Beethoven) =

1796–98 composition by Ludwig van Beethoven

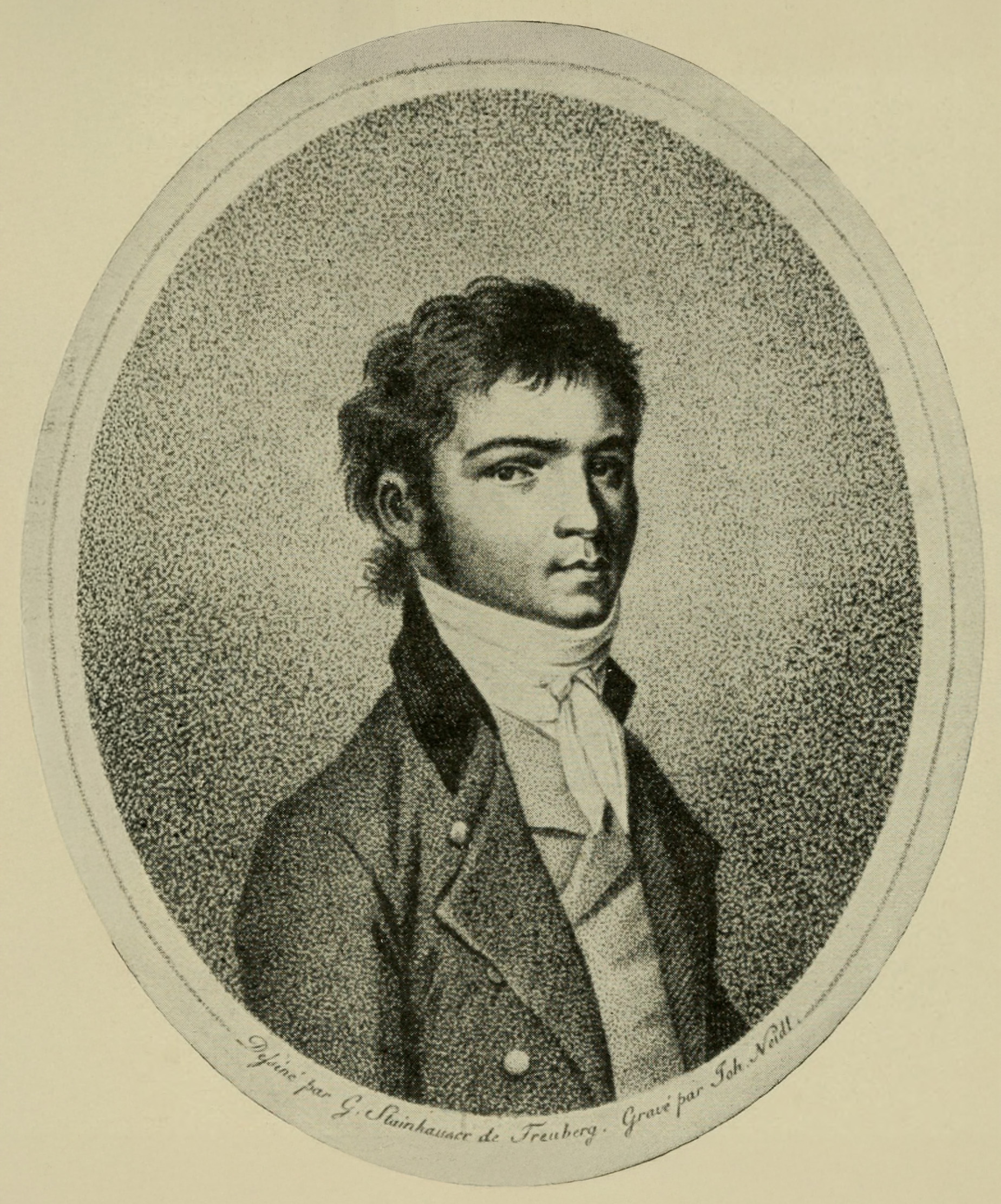
Beethoven in 1796; designed by G. Stainhauser; engraving by Johann Josef Neidl, executed for the publisher Artaria

Ludwig van Beethoven's Piano Sonata No. 5 in C minor, Op. 10, No. 1 was composed some time during 1796–98. Like all three sonatas of his Op. 10, it is dedicated to Anna Margarete von Browne, the wife of one of Beethoven's patrons, a Russian diplomat in Vienna.

The first movement of the sonata has a 3/4 meter, the second movement 2/4, and the final movement 2/2. Beethoven's Piano Sonata No. 5 is a first-period composition, anticipating more notable C minor works such as the Pathétique Sonata and the Fifth Symphony in its nervous energy.

== Form ==
I. Allegro molto e con brio

II. Adagio molto

III. Finale: Prestissimo
Performed by Artur Schnabel in 1932

The sonata is divided into three movements:

1. Allegro molto e con brio in C minor
2. Adagio molto in A♭ major
3. Finale: Prestissimo in C minor

=== I. Allegro molto e con brio ===
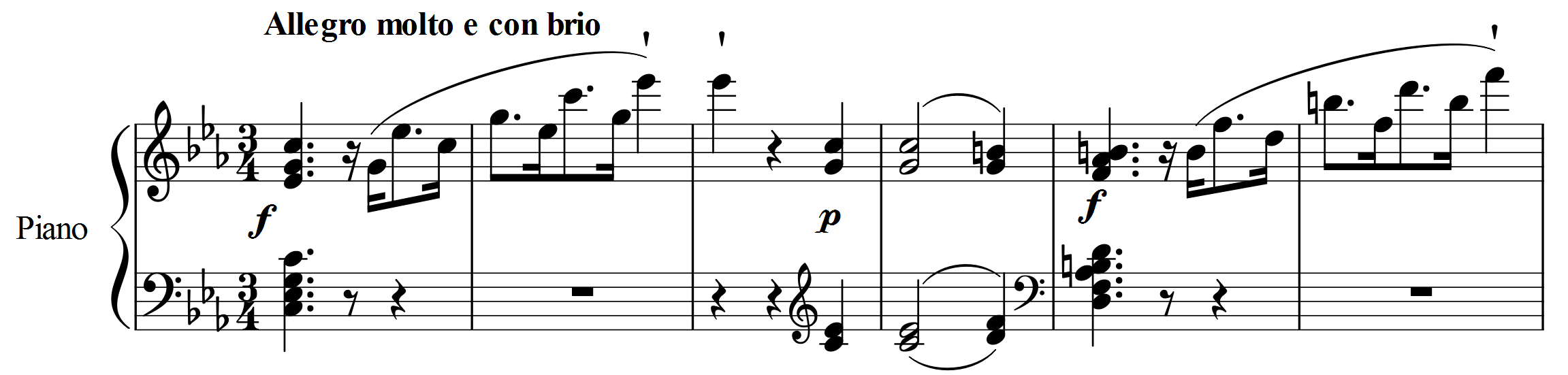

The first movement, in sonata form, opens energetically with contrasting loud and soft phrases. The theme is angular in shape, both in its rising arpeggios and its dotted rhythm. The movement features alternating strongly and weakly stressed bars, though Beethoven gradually and subtly switches the stress from odd-numbered measures to even-numbered measures. In addition to rhythmic syncopation, this movement juxtaposes short fragmentary themes with longer, more lyrical melodies, heightening the dramatic, impulsive effect.

The exposition lasts from mm. 1–105. The primary theme, a modified sentence structure, lasts from mm. 1–30. The transition, which is separately thematized and provides a quiet contrast, is in two parts and lasts from mm. 31–55. The secondary theme, which is accompanied by an Alberti bass, lasts from mm. 56–75 and ends with the essential exposition closure. The closing section, in two parts, quotes both secondary and primary themes.

The development (after Darcy/Hepokoski's Sonata Theory) is half-rotational and divides into pre-core and core sections (after William Caplin); it lasts from mm. 106–168. The retransition, mm. 158–167, leads into the recapitulation.

The recapitulation is at mm. 168–284, 11 measures longer than the exposition. The exposition's transition is altered harmonically in the recapitulation. Initially, the secondary theme is stated in F major (major subdominant), a "false start", before being stated in tonic C minor. The secondary theme is also expanded from the exposition. The essential structural closure is in m. 253.

=== II. Adagio molto ===
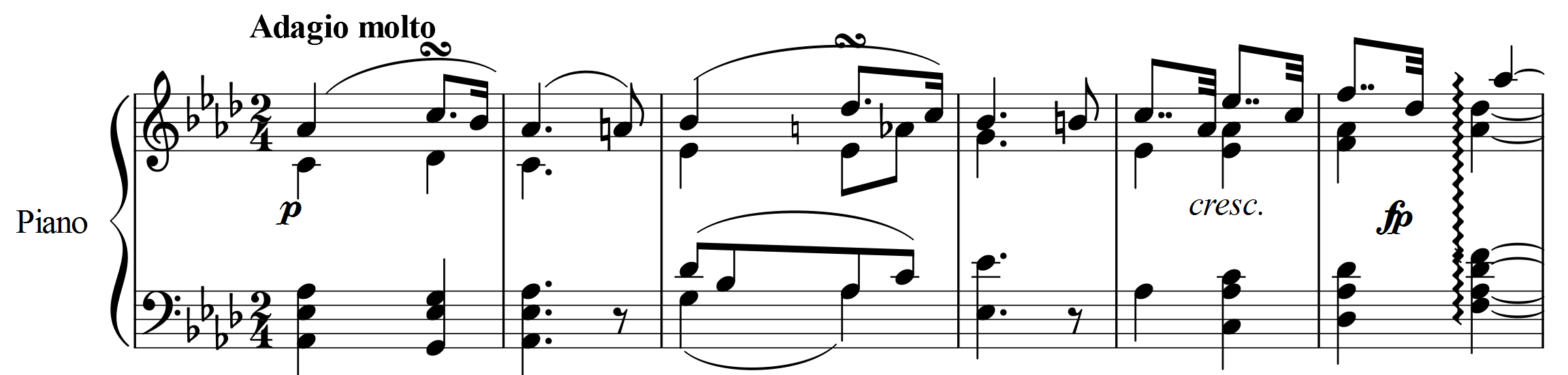

The second movement is a lyrical Adagio with many embellishments. It is in "sonatina" form (there is no development section, only a single bar of a rolled V^{7} chord (E♭^{7}) leading back to the tonic key); an apparent third appearance of the main theme turns into a coda, imitating a cello solo, which slowly fades to a final perfect cadence.

=== III. Finale: Prestissimo ===
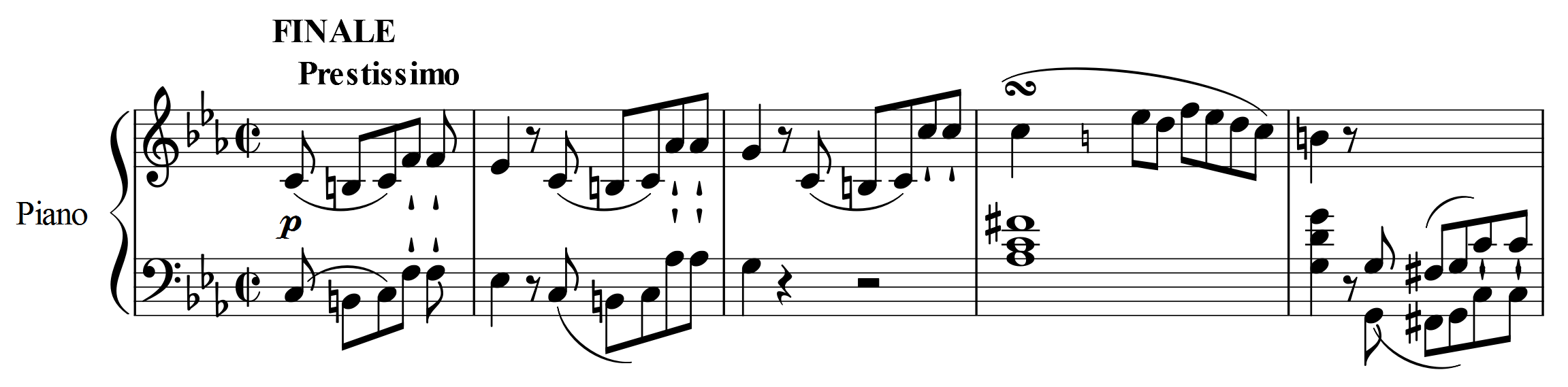

The third movement is in sonata form, making heavy use of a figure of five eighth notes. Like the first movement, it is fast, dramatic, and angular. The short development section contains an unmistakable foreshadow of the theme from Beethoven's Symphony No. 5. It slows down in the coda, leading to a final outburst which fades to a quiet Picardy third on a leading-tone imperfect authentic cadence, giving a sense of relief.
