= William Caplin =

American music theorist

William E. Caplin (born 1948) is an American music theorist who lives and works in Montreal, Quebec, Canada, where he is a James McGill Professor at the Schulich School of Music of McGill University. Caplin served as president of the Society for Music Theory from 2005 to 2007 and was its vice-president from 2001 to 2003. His earlier work concentrated on the history of music theory, but he is best known for a series of articles and two books on musical form in European music around 1800. The first of those books, Classical Form: A Theory of Formal Functions for the Music of Haydn, Mozart, and Beethoven, has been widely influential and was a major factor in the revival of interest in musical form in North American music theory.

== Theory of formal functions ==
Classical Form, along with a more recently published, lengthy textbook intended for both undergraduate and graduate levels, expounds a theory and analytical method for the music of the "high Classical" era (roughly, the two decades before and after 1800). The theory is grounded in eighteenth-century compositional pedagogy and in work by Arnold Schoenberg and his pupil Erwin Ratz. Broadly, the theory can be understood as "a generalized taxonomy of Classical form gleaned from a large repertory of works rather than the description of the organic wholeness or the uniqueness of events in any one work."

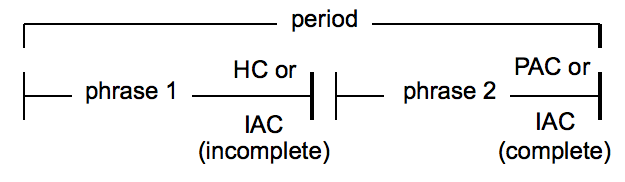
Diagram of a typical period consisting of two phrases

Schoenberg’s concept of the "basic idea" (here understood as a two-measure unit) and his distinction between period and sentence—two models for themes—are the foundation for a theory based on a dichotomy between "tight-knit" and "loose" designs and on "beginning," "middle," and "end" functions. The core figure is the theme (understood paradigmatically as eight bars in length), but formal functions can be extended outward to form sections and entire movements. "Tight-knit" themes and small forms are the sentence, period, hybrid, and compound (16-bar) themes, small ternary, and small binary. "Looser formal regions" are the subordinate theme, transition, development, recapitulation, and coda.

The period is the symmetrical or balanced design familiar from traditional form theory: an antecedent phrase with two contrasting ideas is followed by a consequent phrase that repeats (or slightly varies) the initial two-bar idea and adds a cadential idea to close. The sentence is a progressive or developmental design, where a presentation phrase consists of an idea and its repetition (often varied or transposed) followed by a continuation phrase that, ideally, fragments the initial idea by breaking it into one-bar motives and thereby accelerating movement toward the cadence. The less common hybrid themes mix the components in variously different ways (for example, the antecedent + continuation theme).

The theme types:

- Sentence
- Period
- Hybrid 1: antecedent + continuation
- Hybrid 2: antecedent + cadential
- Hybrid 3: compound basic idea + continuation
- Hybrid 4: compound basic idea + consequent

For hybrid 2: "cadential" refers to a phrase where a typical progression in a cadence (usually just two bars) is stretched over the entire phrase. Often this function is filled by the Expanded Cadential Progression (ECP) or I^{6}–ii^{6}–V–I. For hybrids 3 and 4: the compound basic idea is itself a hybrid: it has the antecedent's basic idea & contrasting idea pair, but it has the presentation's (usually) simple tonic prolongation. From these examples it can be seen that harmony has a powerful, often determining, role in Caplin's theory.

Compound themes are of two types: the 16-measure period, which is the same as the traditional double period, and the 16-measure sentence. The 16-measure period opens with an antecedent consisting of any eight-bar theme, which ends with a half cadence (HC) rather than a perfect authentic cadence (PAC). The eight-bar consequent repeats the opening but adjusts the cadence to a PAC. The 16-measure sentence is paradigmatically an eight-bar presentation, consisting of a compound basic idea and its repetition, followed by an eight-bar continuation with the typical features of fragmentation and sequence.

In larger contexts in Classical-era music, passages of tight-knit and loose-knit functions tend to alternate, the tight-knit units being represented by the themes above, the loose knit units by isolated phrases, model-sequence groups, "standing on the dominant," and other entities.

Pragmatically, the "strict definition of formal categories [is] applied with ‘considerable flexibility’ in analysis." Thus, data for a set of analyses could be read as objective information but could just as easily be taken as a catalogue of the analyst’s choices. The assignment of labels for thematic elements often involves a judgment call. The form-function theory, in other words, is both taxonomic and interpretative; it is from balancing the two that one can learn the most about the repertoires under analysis. The theory has, nevertheless, been criticized for a "zeal for exhaustive theoretical and terminological rigor" that can interfere with that flexibility in analysis, and specifically for its "dogged adherence to a rigidly quadratic conception of grouping structures" [source needed, linked source does not contain any of these quotes]; that is, to ideas defined as two bars and themes defined as eight bars. A related criticism is Caplin's "tendency to substitute [a formal/functional] archetype for the music in question as the point of reference for analytical discussion."

Although intended for, and derived specifically from, the music of Haydn, Mozart, and Beethoven, the theory of formal functions has been extended by various authors, mostly to later repertoires and largely in connection with the sentence paradigm (notably, Schubert, Schumann, Wagner, Schoenberg, and music in film) but occasionally earlier as well (especially J.S. Bach). See "Further reading" below.

In German-speaking discourse, Caplin's understanding of "Formfunktionen" (formal functions) and the coupling of "formal functions" and "loose" designs has been criticized as dogmatic.
