= Piano Sonata No. 5 =

Piano Sonata No. 5 may refer to:

- Piano Sonata No. 5 (Beethoven)
- Piano Sonata No. 5 (Mozart)
- Piano Sonata No. 5 (Prokofiev)
- Piano Sonata No. 5 (Scriabin)
