= Piano Sonata No. 10 (Mozart) =

1783 piano sonata by W. A. Mozart

Piano Sonata in C major
- No. 10
- by W. A. Mozart
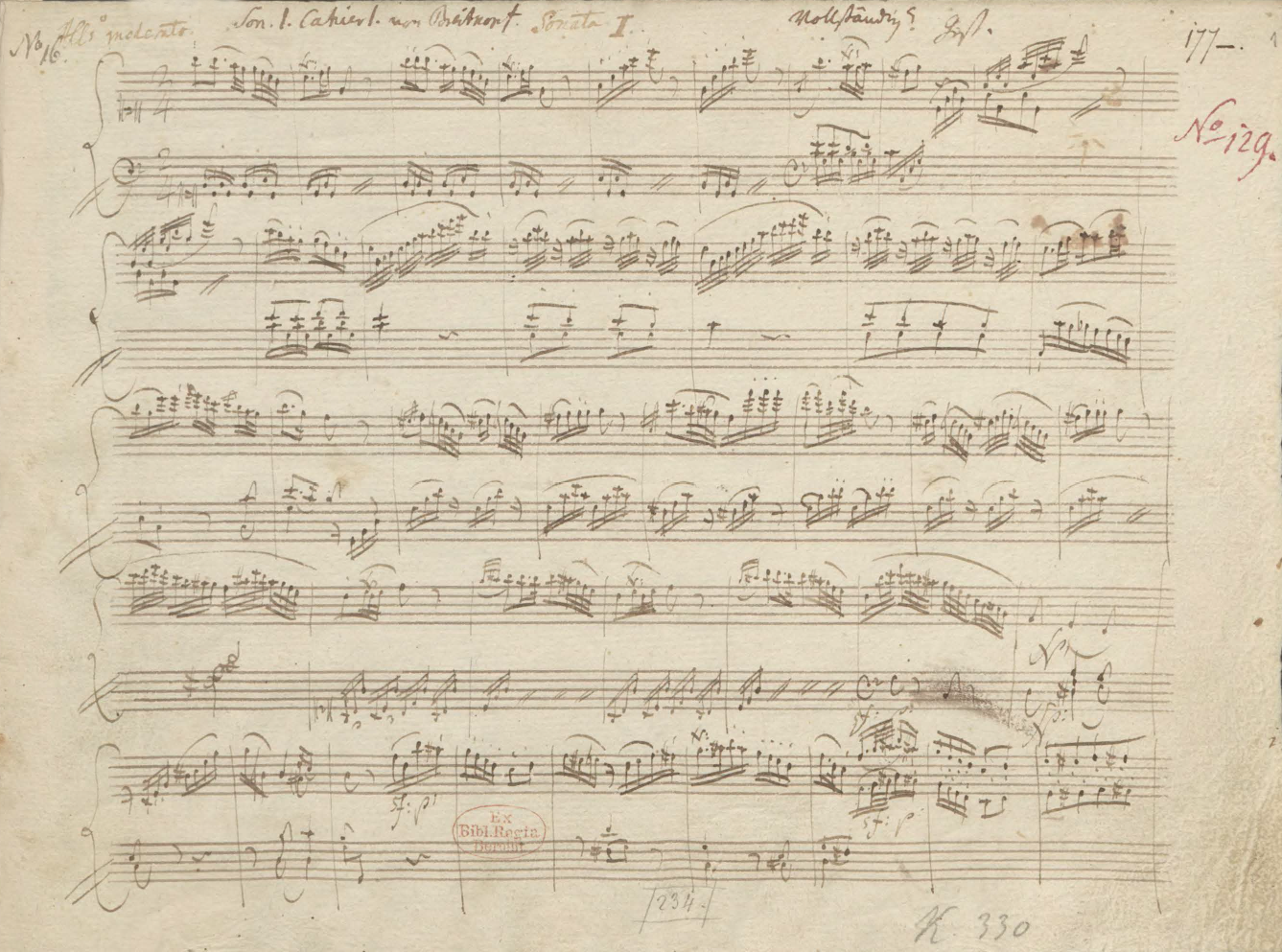
- Mozart's autograph manuscript
- Key: C major
- Catalogue: K. 330 / 300h
- Style: Classical period
- Composed: 1783
- Published: 1784
- Movements: Three (Allegro moderato, Andante cantabile, Allegretto)

Wolfgang Amadeus Mozart's Piano Sonata No. 10 in C major, K. 330 / 300h, is one of the three works in the cycle of piano sonatas K.330–331–332. The sonata was composed in 1783, when Mozart was 27 years old. It was published, with the other two sonatas by Artaria in 1784. A typical performance of this sonata lasts around twenty minutes.

Mozart's autograph of the sonata is held in the Jagiellonian Library, Kraków.

== Music ==
The sonata has three movements:

1. Allegro moderato
2. Andante cantabile, in F major
3. Allegretto

=== I. Allegro moderato ===
I. Allegro moderato
performed by Bernd Krueger

The first movement typically takes about five to nine minutes to perform. The length of the movement depends largely on whether both repeats (the repeat of the exposition and the repeat of the development and recapitulation) are observed. The movement shows two clear major themes, which have been decorated by the use of ornamentation, as was typical of the time.

The movement is in typical sonata form (composed of exposition, development, and recapitulation).

The first subject is in tonic key of C major and modulates to the dominant, G major, for the exposition of the second subject. The development is more intense and contains wider modulations. In the recapitulation, the first subject is heard, again in C major. The music then modulates to G major, and then returns to C major for the recapitulation of the second subject in the tonic key.

=== II. Andante cantabile ===
II. Andante cantabile
performed by Bernd Krueger

The second movement takes between five and seven minutes to perform. The very end of the movement which Mozart wrote, an F major coda, was misplaced in the autograph but appears in the 1784 publication.

This key is F major, the subdominant of C major. After the A section is heard, the music then modulates to the B section in the parallel key of F minor, and its relative key (A-flat major). The movement then modulates to its home key back to the A section, followed by a short coda.

=== III. Allegretto ===
III. Allegretto
performed by Bernd Krueger

The third movement is the most energetic among the movements of the sonata. Performance times range from three to five minutes. Use of arpeggios is prevalent throughout the piece. Like the second movement, the last few bars were lost in the autograph as well.
