= Piano Sonata No. 12 =

Piano Sonata No. 12 may refer to:

- Piano Sonata No. 12 (Beethoven)
- Piano Sonata No. 12 (Mozart)
