= Ritornello =

Recurring passage in Baroque music

A ritornello [ritorˈnɛllo] (Italian; "little return") is a recurring passage in Renaissance music and Baroque music for orchestra or chorus.

== Early history ==
The earliest use of the term "ritornello" in music referred to the final lines of a fourteenth-century madrigal, which were usually in a rhyme scheme and meter that contrasted with the rest of the song. Scholars suggest that the word "ritornello" comes either from the Italian word ritorno (meaning return), or from tornando (meaning turnaround or flourish). Literally, in Italian it means "little return".

== Baroque music ==
The ritornello as a recurring tutti passage can be traced back to the music of sixteenth-century Venetian composer Giovanni Gabrieli. According to Richard Taruskin, these repeating passages are "endemic to the concertato style" which Gabrieli is credited with developing.

The idea of an orchestral ritornello played an important role in the structure of opera in the eighteenth century. The most common form for an aria during the Baroque period was da capo form, which essentially consisted of an A section followed by a contrasting B section, which was in turn followed by a return of the A section. Many da capo arias could be subdivided further, with ritornello sections framing each of the singer's solo sections, forming the scheme | R--A1—R--A2—R | B | R--A1—R--A2—R ||.

The ritornello was also crucial in the development of the Italian instrumental concerto during the Baroque period. Giuseppe Torelli wrote many violin concertos in which the fast movements used a recurring ritornello in between two extended solo passages of entirely new material. This form was standardized by Antonio Vivaldi, who wrote hundreds of concertos using a modification of Torelli's scheme. Vivaldi's ritornello form established a set of conventions followed by later composers in the eighteenth century:

- Ritornellos for the full orchestra alternate with episodes for the soloist or soloists.
- The opening ritornello is composed of several small units, typically two to four measures in length, some of which may be repeated or varied. These segments can be separated from each other or combined in new ways without losing their identity as the ritornello.
- Later statements of the ritornello are usually partial, comprising only one or some of the units, sometimes varied.
- The ritornellos are guideposts to the tonal structure of the music, confirming the keys to which the music modulates. The first and last statements are in the tonic; at least one (usually the first to be in a new key) is in the dominant; and others may be in closely related keys.

In these visits to different keys, ritornello form differs from the later Classical form rondo, in which the recurring section remains in the same key. Vivaldi also established a convention of using ritornello form for the quick opening and closing movements, with a contrasting slow movement in between. Many later Baroque composers such as Bach and Telemann followed Vivaldi's models in composing their own concertos.

Some scholars argue that "ritornello form quickly disappeared as a general constructive principle" in the early years of the nineteenth century, due to the structural innovations of Beethoven. Others such as William Caplin suggest that the ritornello form did not disappear, but "was transformed into concerto form through the incorporation of classical formal functions, especially those associated with the sonata." Caplin argues that the outlines of ritornello form persist in the alternation of solo and tutti sections, albeit subsumed within the tonal and formal plan of the sonata.

Ritornello construction faded with the advent of the new sonata form but received renewed interest in the 20th century.

== See also ==
- Refrain
