= Sentence length =

Sentence length may refer to:

- In linguistics, the length of a Sentence (linguistics)
- In penology, the length of a Sentence (law)
- In music, the length of a Sentence (music)
