= Musical form =

Structure of a piece of music

In music, form refers to the structure of a musical composition or performance. In his book, Worlds of Music, Jeff Todd Titon suggests that a number of organizational elements may determine the formal structure of a piece of music, such as "the arrangement of musical units of rhythm, melody, and/or harmony that show repetition or variation, the arrangement of the instruments (as in the order of solos in a jazz or bluegrass performance), or the way a symphonic piece is orchestrated," among other factors. It is "the ways in which a composition is shaped to create a meaningful musical experience for the listener."

Form refers to the largest shape of the composition. Form in music is the result of the interaction of the four structural elements described above [sound, harmony, melody, rhythm].

These organizational elements may be broken into smaller units called phrases, which express a musical idea but lack sufficient weight to stand alone. Musical form unfolds over time through the expansion and development of these ideas. In tonal harmony, form is articulated primarily through cadences, phrases, and periods. "Form refers to the larger shape of the composition. Form in music is the result of the interaction of the four structural elements," which are sound, harmony, melody, and rhythm.

It has been recently stated that form can be present under the influence of musical contour, also known as contouric form. In 2017, Scott Saewitz brought attention to this concept by highlighting the occurrence in Anton Webern's "Dormi Jesu" (from his Fünf Canons nach lateinischen Texten, Op. 16, No. 2.).

Compositions that do not follow a fixed structure and rely more on improvisation are considered free-form. A fantasia is an example of this. The composer Claude Debussy wrote in 1907, "I am more and more convinced that music is not, in essence, a thing that can be cast into a traditional and fixed form. It is made up of colors and rhythms."

== Labeling ==
To aid in the process of describing form, musicians have developed a simple system of labeling musical units with letters. In his textbook Listening to Music, professor Craig Wright writes:

The first statement of a musical idea is designated A. Subsequent contrasting sections are labeled B, C, D, and so on. If the first or any other musical unit returns in varied form, then that variation is indicated by a superscript number—A^{1} and B^{2}, for example. Subdivisions of each large musical unit are shown by lowercase letters (a, b, and so on).

Some writers also use a prime label (such as B′, pronounced "B prime," or B″, pronounced "B double prime") to denote sections that are closely related, but vary slightly.

== Levels of organization ==
The founding level of musical form can be divided into two parts:

- The arrangement of the pulse into unaccented and accented beats, the cells of a measure that, when harmonized, may give rise to a motif or figure.
- The further organization of such a measure, by repetition and variation, into a true musical phrase having a definite rhythm and duration that may be implied in melody and harmony, defined, for example, by a long final note and a breathing space. This phrase may be regarded as the fundamental unit of musical form: it may be broken down into measures of two or three beats, but its distinctive nature will then be lost. Even at this level, the importance of the principles of repetition and contrast, weak and strong, climax and repose, can be seen. (Note: See also: Meter (music)) Thus, form may be understood on three levels of organization which can be roughly designated as passage, piece, and cycle.

=== Passage ===
The smallest level of construction concerns the way musical phrases are organized into musical sentences and "paragraphs" such as the verse of a song. This may be compared to, and is often decided by, the verse form or meter of the words or the steps of a dance.

For example, the twelve-bar blues is a specific verse form; common meter is found in many hymns and ballads; and the Elizabethan galliard, like many dances, requires a certain rhythm, pace, and length of melody to fit its repeating pattern of steps. Simpler styles of music may be more or less wholly defined at this level of form, which therefore does not differ greatly from the loose sense first mentioned and which may carry with it rhythmic, harmonic, timbral, occasional and melodic conventions.

=== Piece (or movement) ===
The next level concerns the entire structure of any single self-contained musical piece or movement. If the hymn, ballad, blues, or dance alluded to above simply repeats the same musical material indefinitely then the piece is said to be in strophic form overall. If it repeats with distinct, sustained changes each time (for instance, in setting, ornamentation, or instrumentation) then the piece is a theme and variations. If two distinctly different themes are alternated indefinitely, as in a song alternating verse and chorus or in the alternating slow and fast sections of the Hungarian czardas, then this gives rise to a simple binary form. If the theme is played (perhaps twice), then a new theme is introduced, the piece then closing with a return to the first theme, we have a simple ternary form.

Great arguments and misunderstanding can be generated by such terms as "ternary" and "binary," as a complex piece may have elements of both at different organizational levels. A minuet, like any Baroque dance, generally had a simple binary structure (AABB). However, this structure was frequently extended by the addition of another minuet arranged for solo instruments (called the trio), after which the first was repeated again and the piece ended: this is a ternary form (ABA). A "minuet and trio" is thus binary on the lower compositional level but ternary on the higher. Organisational levels are not clearly and universally defined in western musicology, while words like "section" and "passage" are used at different levels by different scholars whose definitions, as Schlanker points out, cannot keep pace with the myriad innovations and variations devised by musicians.

=== Cycle ===
The grandest level of organization may be referred to as "cyclical form." It concerns the arrangement of several self-contained pieces into a large-scale composition. For example, a set of songs with a related theme may be presented as a song-cycle, whereas a set of Baroque dances were presented as a suite. The opera and ballet may organize song and dance into even larger forms. The symphony, generally considered to be one piece, nevertheless usually divides into multiple movements (and an individual movement can often stand on its own as a self-contained piece). This level of musical form, though it again applies and gives rise to different genres, takes more account of the methods of musical organisation used. For example, a symphony, a concerto, and a sonata differ in scale and aim, yet generally resemble one another in the manner of their organization. The individual pieces which make up the larger form may be called movements.

== Common forms in Western music ==
Schools suggested that European classical music had only six stand-alone forms: simple binary, simple ternary, compound binary, rondo, air with variations, and fugue (although musicologist Alfred Mann emphasized that the fugue is primarily a method of composition that has sometimes taken on certain structural conventions).

Charles Keil classified forms and formal detail as "sectional, developmental, or variational."

=== Sectional form ===
This form is built from a sequence of clear-cut units that may be referred to by letters but also often have generic names such as introduction and coda; exposition, development, and recapitulation; verse, chorus or refrain, and bridge. Sectional forms include:

==== Strophic form ====
Strophic form (also called verse-repeating form, chorus form, AAA song form, or one-part song form) is a song structure in which all verses or stanzas of the text are sung to the same music.

==== Medley or chain form ====
Medley, potpourri, or chain form is the opposite of strophic form, consisting of "unrelieved variation": it is simply an indefinite sequence of self-contained sections (ABCD...), sometimes with repeats (AABBCCDD...).

==== Binary form ====
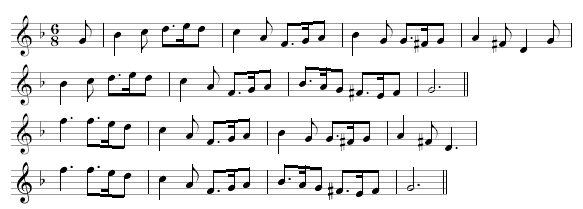
"Greensleeves" as an example of Binary Form.

The term "binary form" is used to describe a musical piece with two sections that are about equal in length. Binary form can be notated as AB or AABB. In the example of "Greensleeves" illustrated here, the first system is almost identical to the second system. We call the first system A and the second system A′ ("A prime") because of the slight difference in the last measure and a half. The next two systems (3rd and 4th) are almost identical as well, but present a new musical idea entirely different from that in the song's first half. We call the third system B and the fourth system B' because of the slight difference in the last measure and a half. As a whole, this piece of music is in binary form: AA′BB′.

==== Ternary form ====
Ternary form is a three-part musical form in which the third part repeats or at least contains the principal idea of the first part, represented as ABA. There are both simple and compound ternary forms. Da capo arias (the term is Italian, meaning "from the head") are usually in simple ternary form. A compound ternary form (or trio form) similarly involves an ABA pattern, but each section is itself either in binary (two sub-sections which may be repeated) or (simple) ternary form.

==== Rondo form ====
This form has a recurring theme alternating with different (usually contrasting) sections called "episodes." It may be asymmetrical (ABACADAEA) or symmetrical (ABACABA). A recurring section, especially the main theme, is sometimes more thoroughly varied, or else one episode may be a "development" of it. A similar arrangement is the ritornello form of the Baroque concerto grosso. Arch form (ABCBA) resembles a symmetrical rondo without intermediate repetitions of the main theme.

==== Variational form ====
Variational forms are those in which variation is an important formative element.

In a "theme and variations," a theme, which in itself can be of any shorter form (binary, ternary, etc.), forms the only "section" and is repeated indefinitely (as in strophic form) but varied each time (ABAFZA, for example), so as to make a sort of sectional chain form. An important variant of this form, much used in 17th-century British music and in the passacaglia and chaconne, was that of the ground bass—a repeating bass theme or basso ostinato over and around which the rest of the structure unfolds, often, but not always, spinning polyphonic or contrapuntal threads, or improvising divisions and descants. This is said by Scholes (1977) to be the form par excellence of unaccompanied or accompanied solo instrumental music. The rondo is often found with sections varied, in forms such as AA^{1}BA^{2}CA^{3}BA^{4} or ABA^{1}CA^{2}B^{1}A.

==== Sonata-allegro form ====
Sonata-allegro form (also sonata form or first movement form) is typically cast in a greater ternary form, having the nominal subdivisions of exposition, development and recapitulation. Usually, but not always, the A parts (exposition and recapitulation) may be subdivided into two or three themes or theme groups which are taken asunder and recombined to form the B part (the development)—thus, for example, AabB[dev. of a and/or b]A^{1}ab^{1}+coda.

The sonata form is "the most important principle of musical form, or formal type from the classical period well into the twentieth century." It is usually used as the form of the first movement in multi-movement works. So, it is also called "first-movement form" or "sonata-allegro form" (because very commonly first movements are in allegro tempo).

Each section of sonata form movement has its own function:

- It may have an introduction at the beginning.
- Following the introduction, the exposition is the first required section. It lays out the thematic material in its basic version. There are usually two themes or theme groups in the exposition, and they are often in contrasting styles and keys and connected by a transition. A closing theme concludes the exposition section.
- The exposition is followed by the development section in which the material in the exposition is developed.
- After the development section, there is a returning section called recapitulation where the thematic material returns in the tonic key.
- A coda may follow the recapitulation to end the movement.

== Forms used in Western popular music ==
Some forms are used predominantly within popular music, including genre-specific forms. Popular music forms are often derived from strophic form (AAA song form), 32-bar form (AABA song form), verse-chorus form (AB song form) and 12-bar blues form (AAB song form).

=== Sectional forms ===
- AABA a.k.a. American Popular
- AB a.k.a. Verse/Chorus
  - ABC a.k.a. Verse/Chorus/Bridge
- ABAB
- ABAC a.k.a. Verse/Chorus/Verse/Bridge
- ABCD a.k.a. Through-composed
- Blues Song forms
  - AAB a.k.a. Twelve-bar blues
  - 8-Bar Blues
  - 16-Bar Blues

See

=== Extended forms ===
Extended form are forms that have their root in one of the forms above, however, they have been extended with additional sections. For example:

- AAAAA
- AABABA

=== Compound forms ===
Also called Hybrid song forms. Compound song forms blend together two or more song forms.

=== Section names in popular music ===
- Introduction a.k.a. Intro
- Verse
- Refrain
- Pre-chorus / Rise / Climb
- Chorus
- Post-chorus
- Bridge
- Middle-Eight
- Solo / Instrumental Break
- Collision
- CODA / Outro
- Ad Lib (Often in CODA / Outro)

== Cyclical forms ==
In the 13th century the song cycle emerged, which is a set of related songs (as the suite is a set of related dances). The oratorio took shape in the second half of the 16th century as a narrative recounted—rather than acted—by the singers.

== See also ==
- Developing variation
- List of musical genres by era
- Musical analysis
- Program music
