= Transition (music) =

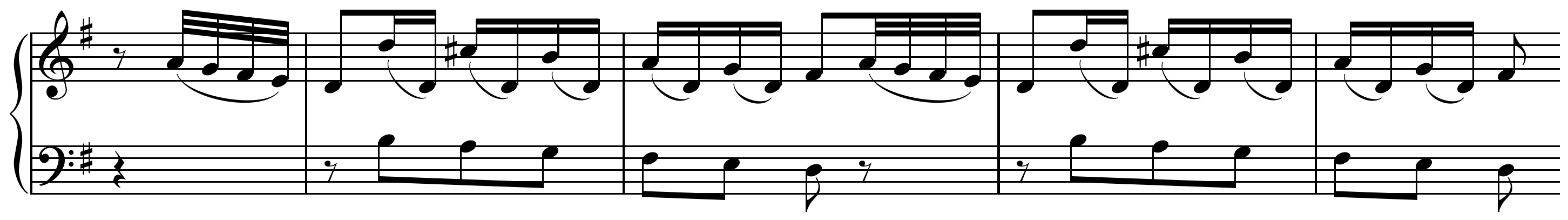
Transition Haydn's Sonata in G Major, Hob. XVI: G1, I, mm. 13-16.

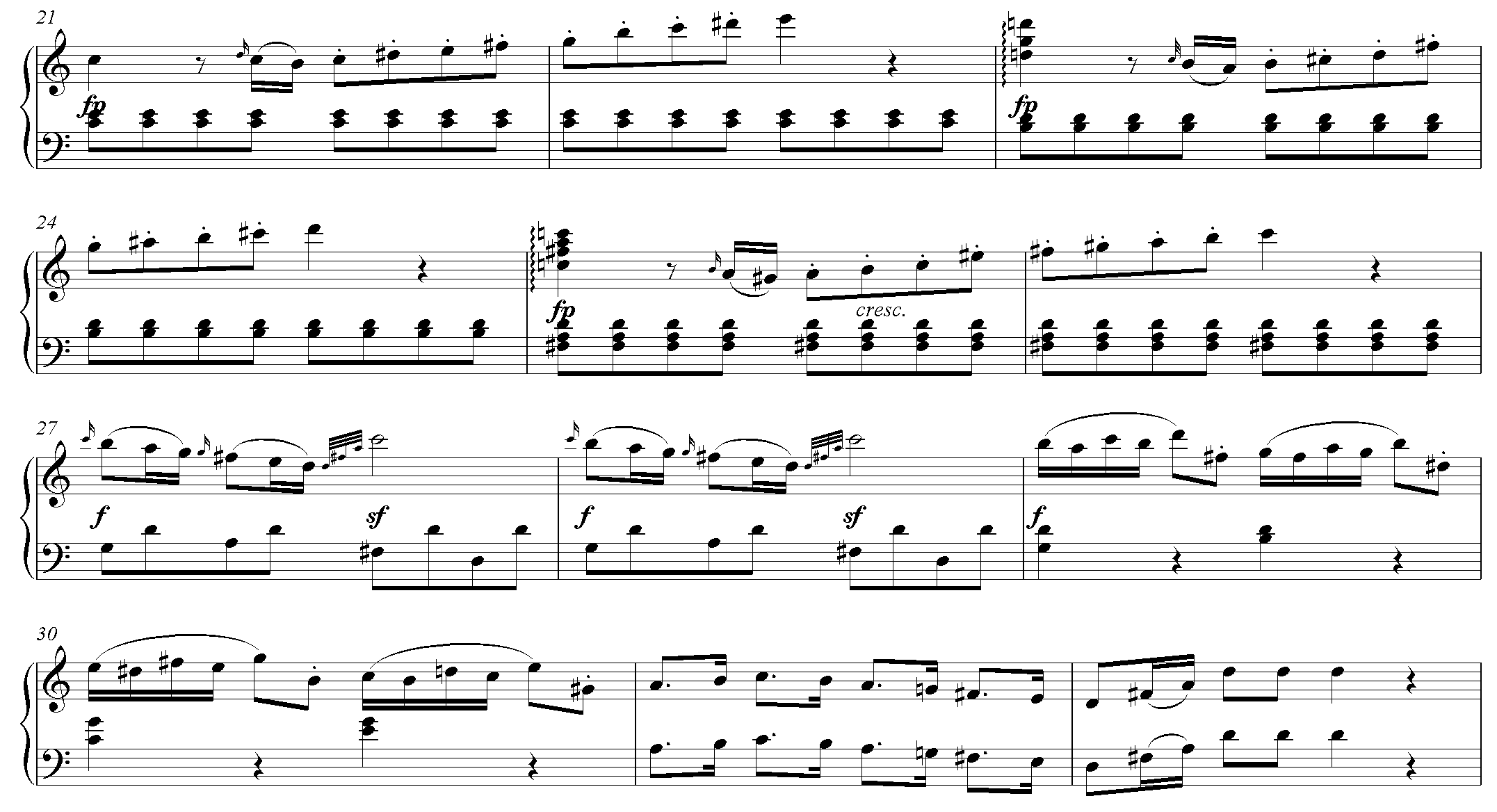
Transition in the exposition of Mozart's Sonata in C Major, K. 309, I, mm. 21-32

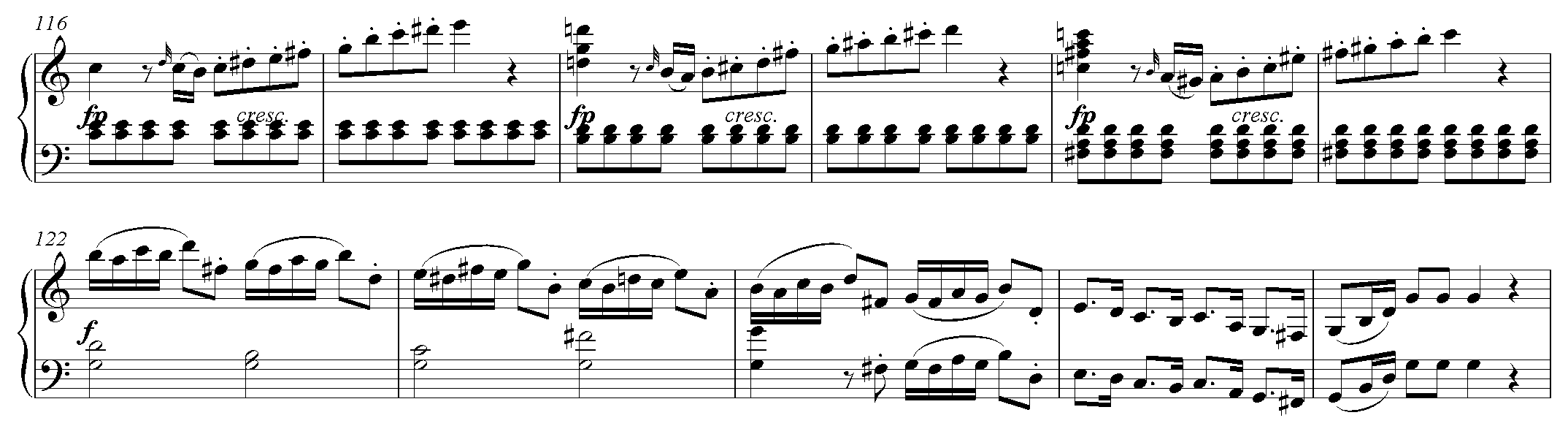
Transition in the recapitulation of Mozart's Sonata in C Major, K. 309, I, mm. 116-126

A transition is a passage of music composed to link one section of music to another. Transitions often function as a moment of transformation and may, or may not in themselves, introduce new, musical material.

Often in music, the transition is the middle section or formal function, while the main theme is the beginning, and the subordinate theme is the ending. It may traditionally be a part of the sonata form's exposition in which the composer modulates from the key of the first subject to the key of the second, though many Classical era works move straight from first to second subject groups without any transition.

For example, transition may be defined as different from a subordinate theme (rondo form) or a developmental core.

In sonata form, a retransition (the transition to the recapitulation) is the last part of the development section which prepares for the return of the first subject group in the tonic, most often through a grand prolongation of the dominant seventh.

== See also ==
- Bridge (music)
- Coda (music)
