= Erwin Ratz =

Erwin Ratz (22 December 1898, Graz – 12 December 1973, Vienna) was an Austrian musicologist and music theorist. He is known especially for his work as president of the Gustav Mahler Gesellschaft and for his book Einführung in die musikalische Formenlehre. During Nazi rule, he saved the lives of several Austrian Jews by sheltering them in his apartment for a number of years.

== Biography ==
Between 1918 and 1922, Ratz studied musicology with Guido Adler at the Institute of Musicology of the University of Vienna. At the same time (between 1917 and 1920), he participated in Arnold Schoenberg's seminar for composition and was active in the Schoenberg circle. Schoenberg's students included pianist Olga Novakovic and Hanns Eisler, with whom Ratz became friends. Ratz later did all but one of the piano reductions for Eisler's Balladenbuch (1929–31). For Ratz, Schoenberg was the central personality and influence of his youth, their lessons creating the crucial foundations of Ratz's thinking. In 1918, in an attempt to introduce Schönberg's work to a broader public, Ratz organized "ten public rehearsals for Schoenberg's Chamber Symphony", a series of events from which the "Association for Musical Private Performances" emerged in November 1918.

In 1921–1922, due to straitened financial circumstances, he worked at the Bauhaus in Weimar as a secretary. Despite his relatively short time at the Bauhaus, this center of intense artistic life was also extremely influential on Ratz, through the variety and richness of its activities and its lively, comprehensive artistic events, which included the latest musical developments. Ratz returned to Vienna in 1922 or 1923.

During the period of Nazi rule, Ratz took in a number of Jews and hid them in his apartment, effectively saving their lives. He was supported in this by his former wife, Lonny (Leonie) Ratz. In 2016 both were posthumously recognised for their resistance, receiving the title of Righteous Among the Nations from Yad Vashem.

After World War II he became a lecturer in musical form and analysis at the Academy of Music and Performing Arts in Vienna (Akademie für Musik und darstellende Kunst; now the University of Music and Performing Arts Vienna). He also worked as an editor for Universal Edition. In 1957 he received the title of professor. From 1949 to 1968 he was involved (from 1952 in a leading position) in the Austrian section of the International Society for Contemporary Music (ISCM).

Ratz gained international renown as President of the Gustav Mahler Gesellschaft in Vienna, and especially for his role in the publication of the complete edition of Mahler's musical compositions. From 1960, however, Ratz fought against the efforts of Deryck Cooke and others to create performable editions of Mahler's unfinished Tenth Symphony, insisting in articles and interviews that no such attempt could be legitimate given the state of Mahler's draft.

== Introduction to Musical Form ==
Ratz is also known for his work Einführung in die musikalische Formenlehre ("Introduction to Musical Form"), which is devoted primarily to the work of Bach and Beethoven and strives to find commonalities in their compositional principles. Ratz's explanation and expansion of Schoenberg's notions of the "basic idea" and the typology of themes (period and sentence) form the foundation of William Caplin's theory of formal functions.
