= Piano Sonata No. 12 (Mozart) =

1783 composition by W. A. Mozart

- by W. A. Mozart
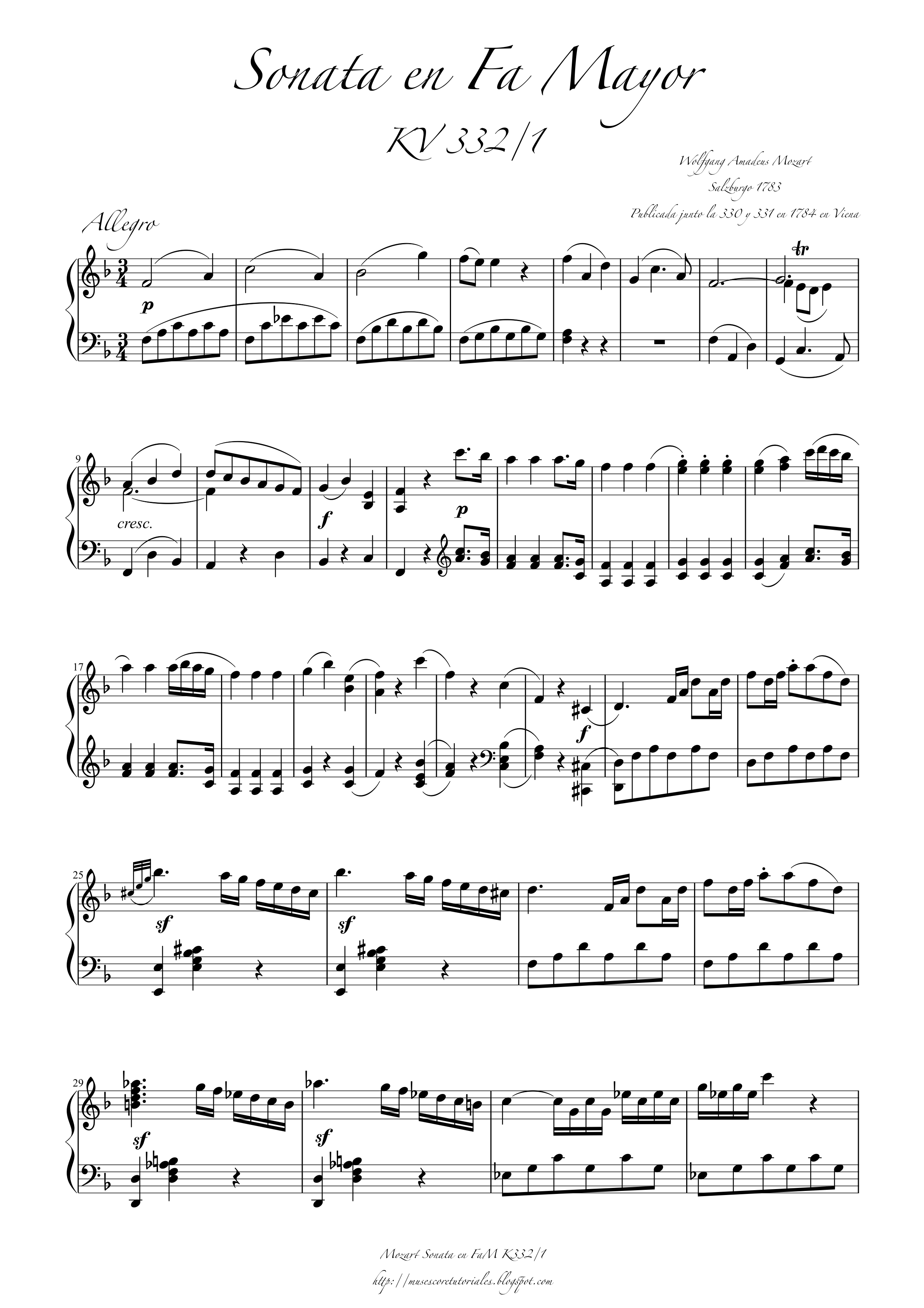
- Beginning
- Key: F major
- Catalogue: K. 332 / 300k
- Style: Classical period
- Composed: 1783
- Published: 1784
- Movements: Three (Allegro, Adagio, Allegro assai)

The Piano Sonata No. 12 in F major, K. 332 (300k) by Wolfgang Amadeus Mozart was published in 1784 along with the Piano Sonata No. 10 in C major, K. 330, and Piano Sonata No. 11, K. 331. Mozart wrote these sonatas either while visiting Munich in 1781, or during his first two years in Vienna. Some believe, however that Mozart wrote this and the other sonatas during a summer 1783 visit to Salzburg made for the purpose of introducing his wife, Constanze to his father, Leopold. All three sonatas were published in Vienna in 1784 as Mozart's Op. 6.

== Movements ==
The sonata consists of three movements and takes approximately 18 minutes to perform (25 minutes with repeats).

=== I. Allegro ===
I. Allegro
performed by Bernd Krueger

The first movement is in a classical sonata form, with repeats for the exposition, the development and recapitulation. There are two basic characteristics exemplified in the first movement: the song-like themes and the combination of styles. Mozart uses diverse styles including galant homophony, learned counterpoint, and even the intense Sturm und Drang style.

The first theme of the exposition begins with a right hand melody over a left hand Alberti bass figure. Next, there is a short melody with the left hand echoing it, while the right hand plays a two-part phrase that includes a Mordent. Immediately following thereafter is parallel motion in both hands in very similar rhythm. A sudden change follows, with the F major key changing into the relative minor key, D minor at measure 23. The second theme (m. 41) begins in the dominant key of C major, is in galant style, and is immediately restated in varied form (m. 49). The remainder of the exposition includes many forte piano dynamics, hemiolas, parallel thirds in the right hand, trills in the right hand, and left hand octaves and broken chords. The exposition ends at measure 93 in C major.

The development section begins at measure 94 with a new melody, focusing on the transitional passage between the second and closing themes in the exposition. As in the exposition, the development includes strikingly similar musical characteristics such as the contrasting forte piano dynamics, hemiolas, left hand octaves, and parallel thirds in the right hand.

The first movement concludes with the recapitulation starting at measure 133, where the first thematic area returns unchanged, the transition modulates to distant harmonies yet closes on the tonic, and the remainder of the exposition returns, transposed into the tonic.

=== II. Adagio ===
II. Adagio
performed by Bernd Krueger

The second movement is in B♭ major in an elaborately ornamented sonatina form. At the beginning, there is a melody accompanied by an Alberti bass figure in the left hand. The next phrase is the same, except the key immediately changes to the parallel minor, B♭ minor. A lyrical passage with a minor descending scale ends with the dominant key. The music then turns happy and joyful, until the end, when the phrases end with a dominant seventh chord of B♭ major, which resolves into the first degree.

=== III. Allegro assai ===
III. Assai allegro
performed by Bernd Krueger

The last movement is a rollicking virtuoso movement in 6/8 time signature in the key of F major. It starts with a forte chord and is followed by a passage of fast 16th notes in the right hand. This is directly followed by parallel sixths between the left hand and right hand lower voice, creating a harmony contrasting to the opening single 16th-note passage. There is a change of character in measure 16 where the music is marked p dolce and the right hand has a simple melody embellished with ornamentation and back-and-forth contrasting legato to staccato articulations. Measure 22 displays yet another character change, where both hands are playing in unison (one octave apart) forte and staccato while moving in an ascending sixth sequential pattern. The music briefly modulates to D minor through octaves and broken chord patterns. This is then followed by C major (measures 41–49), and then C minor (measures 50–64), before coming back to C major at measure 65 and staying in the dominant key through the end of the exposition. Throughout the entire exposition, Mozart uses the model sequence technique, passages of broken chords, parallel motion, scales, and contrasting dynamics and articulations.

The development section begins at measure 91, restating the theme from the exposition, but in C minor. The first half of the development uses the model sequence technique, repeating a 4-measure idea of continuous 16th notes constructed of a descending scale, followed by parallel sixths between the left and right hand lower voice, followed by a broken dominant seventh chord. This section goes through modulations from C minor, to D major, G major, C major again, F major, and then finally to B♭ major beginning at measure 112. The second half of the development section (starting at measure 112) presents a new melodic theme, followed by several broken chords before finally arriving at a dominant chord at measure 139. It is implied that the music is 'standing on the dominant' from measure 139 until the recapitulation returns at measure 148, ending on a perfect authentic cadence.

The recapitulation presents the first theme unaltered until measure 169. The remaining recapitulation presents the same thematic ideas as the exposition, just in slightly altered versions. It concludes with a pianissimo cadence, strikingly different in comparison to the opening of the movement.
