= Sentence (music) =

Complete, somewhat self-contained statement within musical composition

In Western music theory, the term sentence is analogous to the way the term is used in linguistics, in that it usually refers to a complete, somewhat self-contained statement. Usually a sentence refers to musical spans towards the lower end of the durational scale; i.e. melodic or thematic entities well below the level of movement or section, but above the level of motif or measure. The term is usually encountered in discussions of thematic construction. In the last fifty years, an increasing number of theorists such as William Caplin have used the term to refer to a specific theme-type involving repetition and development.

== Sentence as a metaphor for musical statement ==
Since the word "sentence" is borrowed from the study of (verbal) grammar—where its accepted meaning is one that does not admit of straightforward application to musical structures—its use in music has frequently been metaphorical. Especially before the latter half of the twentieth century, different musicians and theorists employ and define the term in different ways. For example, Stewart Macpherson defines a musical sentence as "the smallest period in a musical composition that can give in any sense the impression of a complete statement." It "may be defined as a period containing two or more phrases, and most frequently ending with some form of perfect cadence." Among the simplest examples he gives are what he calls "duple sentences" -- themes (from Mozart's D major Piano Sonata and Beethoven's Third Piano Concerto) in which we find pairs of "balanced" phrases (four-bar "announcing phrase" ending in half-cadence, followed by four-bar "responsive phrase" ending with perfect cadence): to many modern theorists this kind of structure is called a period. Similarly, the Grove Dictionary of Music states that the term "sentence" "has much the same meaning as 'period', though it lacks the flexibility of the latter term."

== Sentence as a specific form-type: Schoenberg tradition ==
The first few measures of Beethoven's Piano Sonata in F minor are a classic example of a musical sentence.

Arnold Schoenberg applied the term "sentence" to a very specific structural type distinct from the antecedent-consequent period. In a sentence's first part, a statement of a "basic motive" is followed by a "complementary repetition" (e.g. the first, "tonic version", of the shape reappears in a "dominant version"); in its second part this material is subjected to "reduction" or "condensation" with the intention of bringing the statement to a properly "liquidated" state and cadential conclusion. The sentence was one of a number of basic form-types Schoenberg described through analysis; another was the period. In Schoenberg's view, "the sentence is a higher form of construction than the period. It not only makes a statement of an idea, but at once starts a kind of development".

Schoenberg's conception of the sentence has been widely adopted in music theory, and appears in many introductory music theory textbooks. While Schoenberg's conception of the sentence is traditionally used in analysis of music from the Classical period, it has also been applied to Classical music of the 19th and 20th centuries, and to American popular songs from the early twentieth century.

== See also ==
- Period (music)
- Phrase (music)

== Sources ==
- Nattiez, Jean-Jacques (1990). Discourse: Toward a Semiology of Music (Musicologie générale et sémiologue, 1987). Translated by Carolyn Abbate (1990). ISBN 0-691-02714-5.
- MacPherson (1930). Form in Music, Joseph Williams Ltd., London.
- Caplin, William E. (1998). Classical Form: A theory of Formal Functions. ISBN 0-19-514399-X.
- Schoenberg, Arnold (1967). "Fundamentals of Music Composition".
