= Introduction (music) =

Musical term; opening section of a movement or separate piece

In music, the introduction is a passage or section which opens a movement or a separate piece, preceding the theme or lyrics. In popular music, this is often known as the song intro or just the intro. The introduction establishes melodic, harmonic or rhythmic material related to the main body of a piece.

Introductions may consist of an ostinato that is used in the following music, an important chord or progression that establishes the tonality and groove for the following music, or they may be important but disguised or out-of-context motivic or thematic material. As such, the introduction may be the first statement of primary or other important material, may be related to but different from the primary or other important material, or may bear little relation to any other material.

A common introduction to a rubato ballad is a dominant seventh chord with a fermata, an introduction that works for many songs is the last four or eight measures of the song, while a common introduction to the twelve-bar blues is a single chorus.

If a movement in sonata form form begins with an introductory section, this introduction is typically not considered part of the movement's exposition.

== See also ==
- Anacrusis
- Dominant (music) and secondary dominant
- Fanfare
- Leading tone
- Overture
- Turnaround (music)
