= Auguste Blondeau =

French composer, violinist, music theorist and historian

Pierre-Auguste-Louis Blondeau (15 October 1786 [the given date is often 15 August 1784] – 14 April 1863) was a 19th-century French composer, violinist, music theorist and historian.

== Biography ==
Born in Paris the son of Jean-Claude Blondeau, violinist and composer, Blondeau was a pupil of Pierre Baillot.

He won a mention at the Prix de Rome in 1807 and in 1808 was awarded the first Grand Prix of Rome in musical composition with his cantata Marie Stuart. He resided at the Villa Medicis in Rome from 1809 to 1811.

He composed religious works, including a Te Deum in honour of Napoléon, cantatas, a buffo opera, orchestral works and chamber music. His three string quartets based on piano sonatas by Beethoven (Nos. 1, 2, and 3) are still popular today.

Blondeau also distinguished himself as a music theorist and historian with writings on Benedetto Marcello and Giovanni Pierluigi da Palestrina.

Blondeau died in Paris on 14 April, 1863 at the age of 76.

== Publications ==
- Voyage d'un musicien en Italie (1809–1812), précédé des observations sur les théâtres italiens, by Auguste-Louis Blondeau and Joël-Marie Fauquet, Éditions Mardaga, 1993.
