= 1796 in music =

== Events ==
- The father of Gioachino Rossini is imprisoned for collaborating with the French, and Rossini's mother takes him to Bologna.

== Classical music ==
- Ludwig van Beethoven
  - Three Piano Sonatas, Op. 2 in F minor, A and C
  - Notturno in D major, Op.42
  - Ah! Perfido, Op.65
  - Duet mit zwei obligaten Augengläsern, WoO 32
  - Sonatina for Mandolin and Harpsichord, WoO 43a
  - Adagio for Mandolin and Harpsichord, WoO 43b
  - Allegretto, WoO 53
  - Abschiedsgesang an Wiens Bürger, WoO 121
- Francois-Adrien Boieldieu – Duo No.2 in B-flat major for Harp and Piano
- Muzio Clementi
  - Concerto for piano in C major
  - Three Piano Sonatas, Op. 35
- Johann Baptist Cramer – Piano Concerto No.2, Op. 16
- Adalbert Gyrowetz – 3 String Quartets, Op. 13
- Joseph Haydn
  - Trumpet Concerto in E Flat Major
  - Die Worte des Erlösers am Kreuze, Hob.XX:2
  - Mass in C major, Hob.XXII:9 Missa in tempore belli ("Mass in Time of War")
  - Mass in B-flat major, Hob.XXII:10
  - Guarda qui, che lo vedrai, Hob.XXVa:1
  - Saper vorrei se m'ami, Hob.XXVa:2
- Hyacinthe Jadin – 3 Piano Sonatas, Op. 5
- Rodolphe Kreutzer – Études ou caprices
- Ignaz Pleyel – 6 Duos, B.574-579
- Giovanni Punto – Horn Concerto No.6
- Jakub Jan Ryba – Missa pastoralis bohemica
- Carl Friedrich Zelter – 12 Lieder am Clavier zu singen, Z.120

== Opera ==
- Domenico Cimarosa
  - I nemici generosi
  - Gli Orazi e i Curiazi
- Nicolas Dalayrac – Marianne
- Johann Simon Mayr – La Lodoiska
- Antonio Salieri – Il Moro
- Gaspare Spontini – Li puntigli delle donne
- Peter Winter – Das unterbrochene Opferfest

== Popular music ==
- "It Was A' For Our Rightful King", 1796 Jacobite song with lyrics by Robert Burns
- Charles Dibdin - Meg of Wapping (from 'General Election')

== Methods and theory writings ==
- Charles Burney – Memoirs of the Life and Writings of the Abate Metastasio
- Wenzel Hause – Méthode de contrebasse
- António da Silva Leite – Estudo de guitarra
- Bernard Viguerie – L'art de toucher le piano-forte

== Births ==
- January 23 – Jean Reboul, librettist and poet (died 1864)
- February 17 – Giovanni Pacini, composer (died 1867)
- June 14 – Mathilda d'Orozco, composer (died 1863)
- June 25 – Ferdinando Giorgetti, Italian composer (died 1867)
- July 22 – Carlo Pepoli, librettist and politician (died 1881)
- July 23 – Franz Berwald, composer (died 1868)
- July 24 – Jan Czeczot, librettist and poet (died 1847)
- July 28 – Ignaz Bösendorfer, piano manufacturer (died 1859)
- July 29 – Christian Winther, lyricist and poet (died 1876)
- August 25 – James Lick, piano builder (died 1876)
- August 27 – Elise Barensfeld, soprano (died after 1820)
- September 3 – Henriette Widerberg, soprano (died 1872)
- September 20 – Franz Wilhelm Ferling, composer and oboist (died 1874)
- November 30 – Carl Loewe, German composer (died 1869)
- December 9 – Emilie Zumsteeg, composer and musician (died 1857)
- date unknown – Mirzə Şəfi Vazeh, lyricist and poet (died 1852)

== Deaths ==
- January 1 – Alexandre-Théophile Vandermonde, chemist and musician, 60
- February 16 (or April 16) – Caterina Gabrielli, operatic soprano, 65
- February 17 – James Macpherson, librettist and writer (born 1736)
- February 28 – Friedrich Wilhelm Rust, composer and violinist (born 1739)
- March 19 – Stephen Storace, composer, 33
- June 8 – Felice Giardini, violinist and composer, 80
- July 17 – Thomas Sanders Dupuis, English composer (born 1733)
- July 21 – Robert Burns, librettist and poet (born 1759)
- August 12 – Mary Ann Wrighten Pownall, librettist and singer (born 1751)
- October 17 – Franz Paul Rigler, composer and piano virtuoso (born c.1748)
- October 31 – Thomas Haxby, musical instrument maker, 67
- date unknown
  - Luffman Atterbury, carpenter, builder and musician
  - Samuel Green, organ builder (born 1740)
  - Nicola Sabatino, composer (born 1705)
