= Op. 2 =

In music, Op. 2 stands for Opus number 2. Compositions that are assigned this number include:

- Beethoven – Piano Sonata No. 1
- Beethoven – Piano Sonata No. 2
- Beethoven – Piano Sonata No. 3
- Brahms – Piano Sonata No. 2
- Britten – Phantasy Quartet
- Chopin – Variations on "Là ci darem la mano"
- Dvořák – String Quartet No. 1 in A major
- Ginastera – Danzas Argentinas
- Goeyvaerts – Nummer 2
- Gottschalk – Bamboula
- Larsson – Symphony No. 1 in D major (1928)
- Mendelssohn – Piano Quartet No. 2
- Mozart – Violin Sonata No. 17
- Nielsen – Fantasy Pieces for Oboe and Piano
- Popov – Chamber Symphony
- Saint-Saëns – Symphony No. 1
- Schubert – Gretchen am Spinnrade
- Schumann – Papillons
- Scriabin – Étude in C-sharp minor, Op. 2, No. 1
- Strauss – Döblinger Réunion-Walzer
- Tchaikovsky – Souvenir de Hapsal
- Vivaldi – Twelve Violin Sonatas, Op. 2
