= OP2 =

OP2, Op-2 or Op. 2 may refer to:

- Op. 2, a designation that stands for Opus number 2 in music,
- OP-2, the second model of the Pitcairn OP, the first rotary-wing aircraft
- DARwIn-OP#ROBOTIS_OP2, a robot project
- OP2, a candidate phylum of bacteria
