= Nobilissima familia (Hungary) =

The terms Nobilissimus (most noble) and nobilissima familia (most noble family) have been used since the 11th century for the King of Hungary and his family. But it were then only a few that were mentioned in documents as such:

- in the year 1055 Bela I of Hungary.
- in the year 1093 Saint Ladislaus I of Hungary.
- in the year 1161 Ladislaus II of Hungary.
- in the year 1213 Gertrude of Merania.
- in the year 1226 Coloman of Lodomeria.
- in the year 1386 Saint Hedwig of Poland.

Besides the most noble family of the King of Hungary were three other families mentioned in court verdicts in the 14th century in Hungary and in Dalmatia as "nobilissima familia" (most noble family):

- in the year 1322 the most noble family of Budislav de genere Percal in a supreme court verdict in a case about the right of jurisdiction in a village.
- in the year 1340 the most noble family of Job Zabroczky de Kesmark, because he could through his genealogy verify, that his family once had come from Dalmatia, because he was the son of Adam, son of Demetrius, son of Jonas, son of Hervard, son of Koloman, son of Gothard, son of Benedictus.
- in the year 1360 the most noble family of duke Gilet de Fraknó, because he gave Fraknó back to the crown.
