= Keglevich Palace =

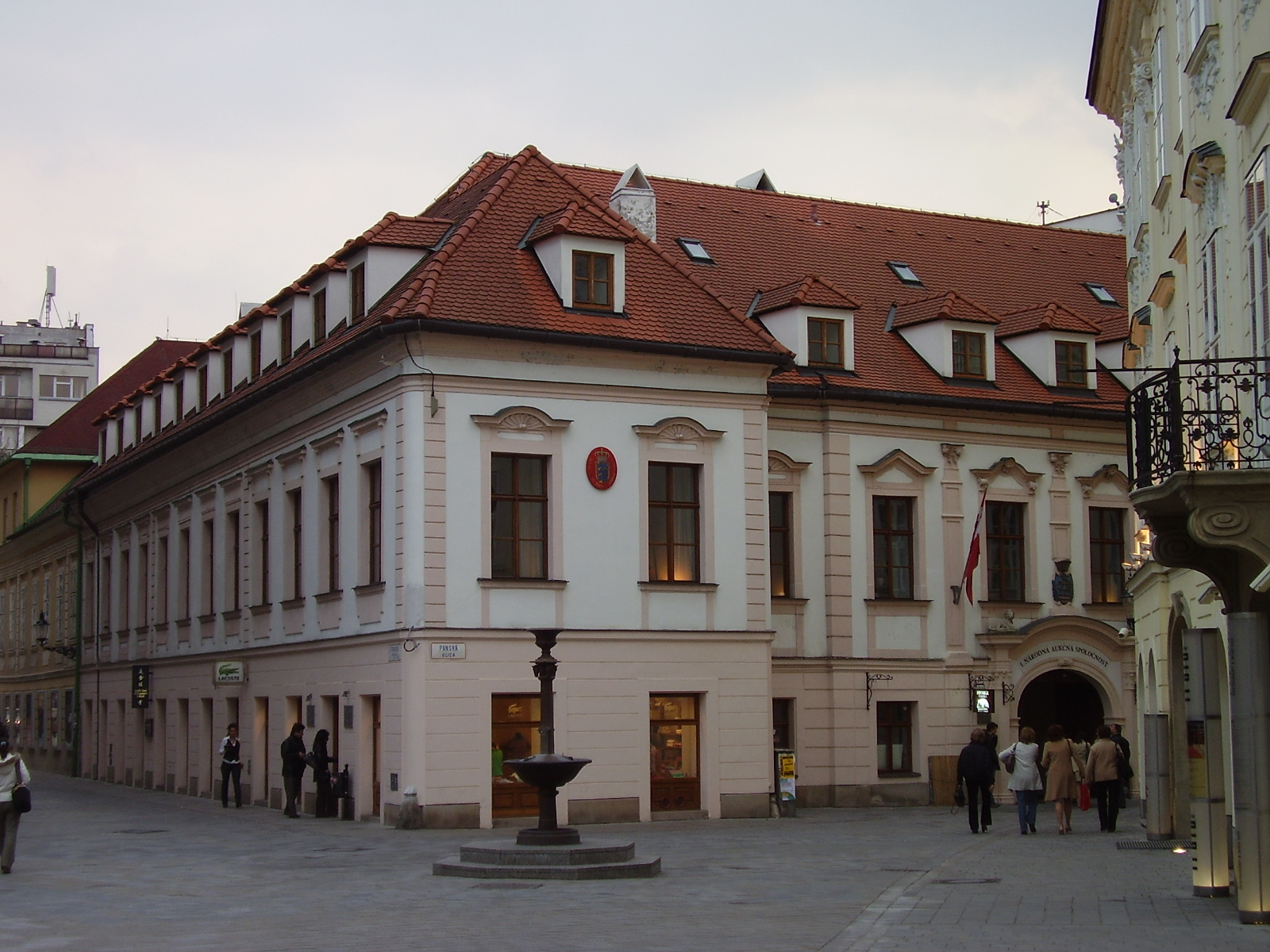

- Location within Slovakia

General information
- Type: Palace
- Location: Bratislava I, Bratislava, Slovakia
- Coordinates: 48.141848°N 17.10643°E

Keglevich Palace (Slovak: Keglevičov palác or Keglevics Palace) is a Baroque mansion on Panska Street 27 in Bratislava, Slovakia. It is included among the National Monuments Reservation of the city and is also listed as a Cultural Real-estate Monument. The last reconstruction was in 1998, involving the roof and facade rendering. Following the reconstruction a new street was named Strakova Street. It is between Venturian Street and Hviezdoslavovo námestie (Bratislava) (literally Hviezdoslav Square).

== History ==
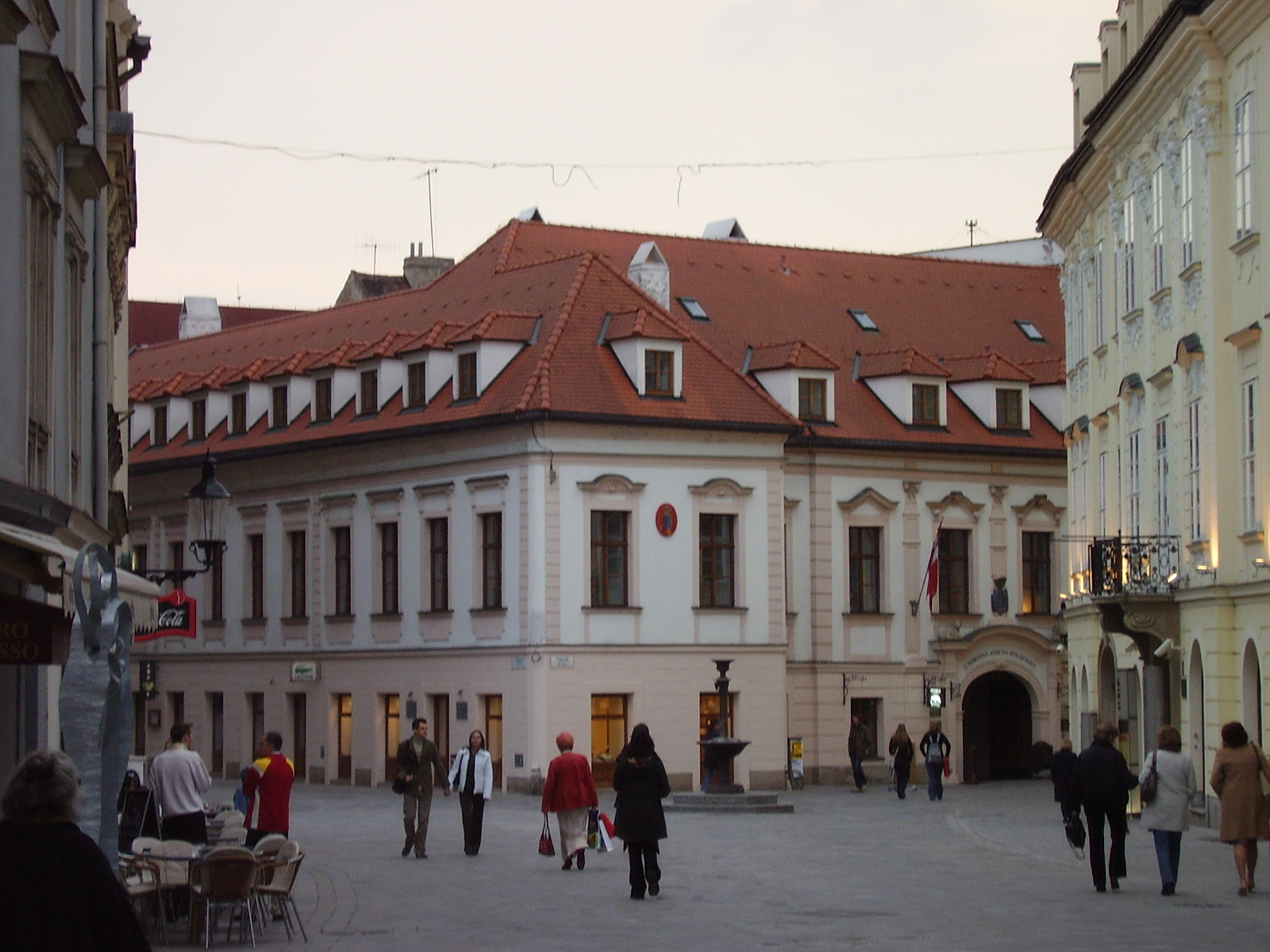
Keglevich Palace - View from Venturian Street

This two-storey Baroque mansion was built in the first half of the 18th century on two parcels of medieval land. It was built using Gothic and Renaissance masonry from previous buildings. The mansion was built by the Count of Torna County, Joseph Keglevich. From 1601 to 1608 the owner was S. Alter. By the 18th century, the ownership had changed several times. In 1634, the owner was Thomas Baranay. From 1646 to 1656, the owner was H. Ch. Pärtinger.

At the beginning of the 18th century, Ladislav Petray and his wife Sophia Ilaas sold the house with some debts to Gabriel Skaricz and his wife Anne Sophia for 50 golden crowns. In 1730, after Gabriel's death, Anne Sophia sold the house to Rosalie Amadeus Simonits for 400 golden crowns. Then Rosalie sold it to counsellor Joseph Duchoň for 7,000 crowns. And after a long time of non-Keglevich ownership, on 15 February 1745 Joseph Duchoň sold the house to Countess Teresa Keglevich (born as von Tavonath) for 7,000 golden crowns.

In 1750, the owner became Count Joseph I. Keglevich. He offered his palace as accommodation for members of Diet of Hungary (Uhorský snem). Joseph I. Keglevich was mentioned as a great owner of the Keglevich Palace in 1764. Later sources do not provide the complete name of the owners, but only the hereditary name of the family, Keglevich. In 1796 Ludwig van Beethoven stayed here, where he wrote his Grand Sonata for the piano, which he dedicated to Babette Keglevich, his student. Arguably, Joseph I. had been the owner of the palace until his death in 1813 when it was inherited by his widow and her son Carl Keglevich. After some architectural improvements and baroque reconstruction, the Keglevich Palace was owned by the Keglevich family until 1850.

In 1850, the mansion became the property of the Pálffy family. It was first owned by Maria Pálffy and later, from 1880 to 1911, by Count Stephen Pálffy.

=== The House of Keglevich ===
Coat-of-arms above the portal

The Kelgevichs partly come from Croatia. They played a significant role in Croatian history during 16th century. One of the most well-known ancestors was George III. Kelgevich. He lived in the 16th century and had two sons, Nicholas and Peter. Peter created the Croatian dynasty while Nicholas began the Hungarian dynasty. In 1646, Nicholas was granted the title of Baron and then in 1687, he and his brother were granted the title of Count.

In 1732, Joseph I. Keglevich was the Vice-counsellor, the counsellor of the secret council, the protector of the Royal Crown and Main District Administrator of Torna County. His son, Joseph II. Keglevich was the secretary of the Vice-council, member of the Diet of Hungary ("Hungarian Parliament") and also, like his father, the protector of the Royal Crown.

== Keglevich Palace and Ludwig van Beethoven ==
The most famous occupant of the Keglevich Palace in 18th-19th century was Anna Louise Barbara Keglevich, also called Babetta (1780-1813). She was the daughter of Carl Keglevich and Catherine Zichy. She was given private lessons by Ludwig van Beethoven in Vienna and Bratislava. Beethoven composed a few sonatas dedicated to Babetta. On 23 November, 1796 in Bratislava, he composed his Piano Sonata No. 4 in E-flat major, Op. 7, Piano Concerto No. 1 in C major, Op. 15, and some other sonatas which he dedicated to the Countess, Anna Louise Barbara Keglevich (or in German Anna von Keglevics). He also played at concerts in the Keglevich Palace.

== Architecture ==
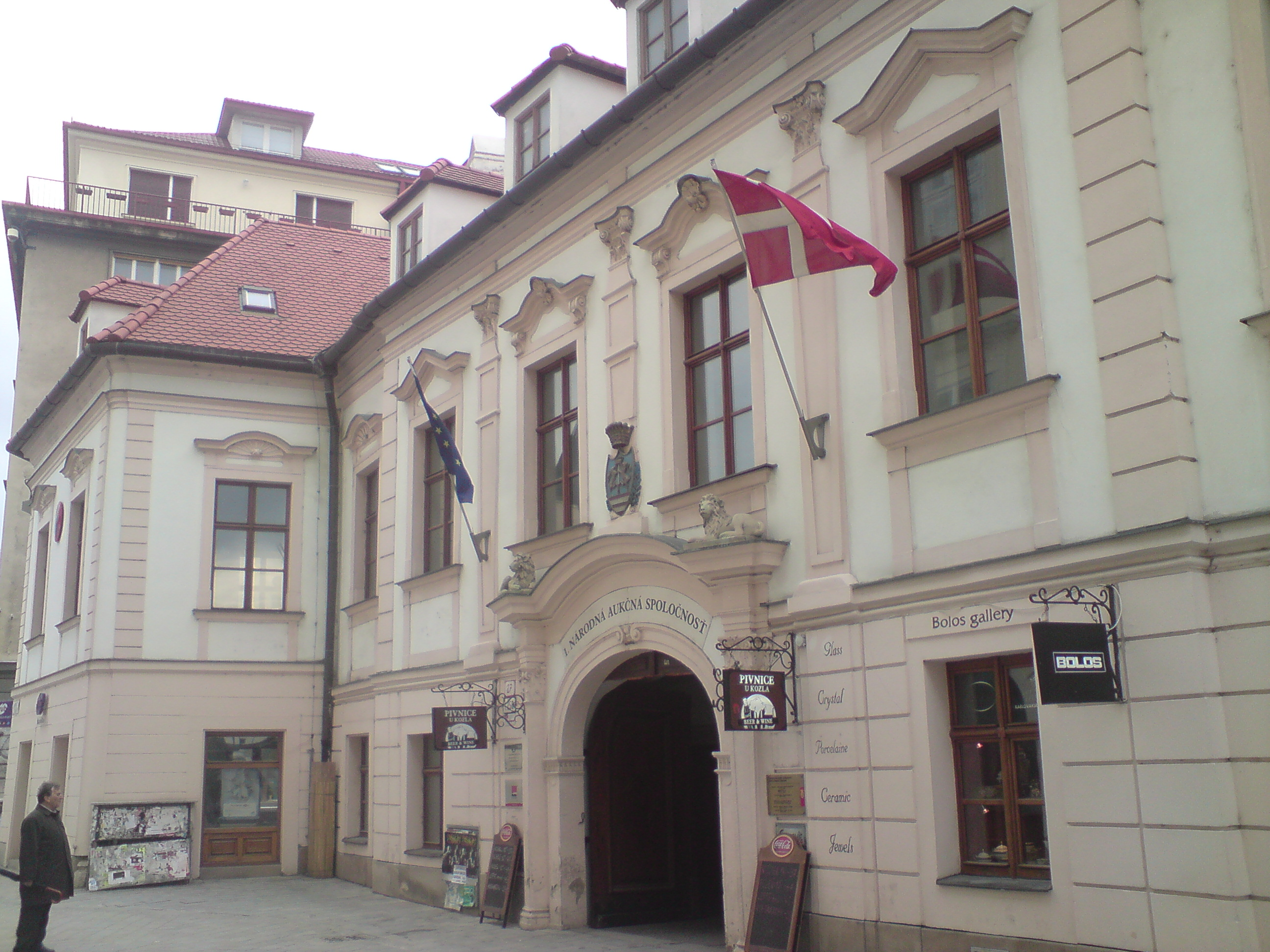
Keglevičov palác

At that time, Keglevich Palace was one of the large palace buildings with disposition of four wings, which reached the medieval defensive walls. Around the 19th century, from side of Hviezdoslav Square, part of the palace was separated and palace remained with three wings. On first floor, in western wing, remained a late-Gothic comb-star-shaped vault from the 16th century. In the eastern wing of the Keglevich palace is an avant-corps which originally was a part of different building. The floor plan of the palace is U-shaped. A wide staircase leads to the first floor. The courtyard wings are linked by a courtyard gallery. Crossbars are split up by pilasters with stylized chaplets.

A portal with pilasters and a segmental cornice is lined with lion statues and decorated with the coat of arms of Count Joseph Keglevich. Above the portal, on red base of the coat of arms are two silver stripes. In the upper blue part there are two golden lions holding a sword with a golden hilt. The crown with nine pearls is run into that hilt, a symbol of countship. Above the shield in the coat of arms there are a few other crowns with nine pearls. Hereditary lions were one of the favourite symbols. They were also used the enhance the sculptural decoration of the portal.
