= Piano Sonata No. 4 (Beethoven) =

1796 composition by Ludwig van Beethoven

- Grand Sonata
- by Ludwig van Beethoven
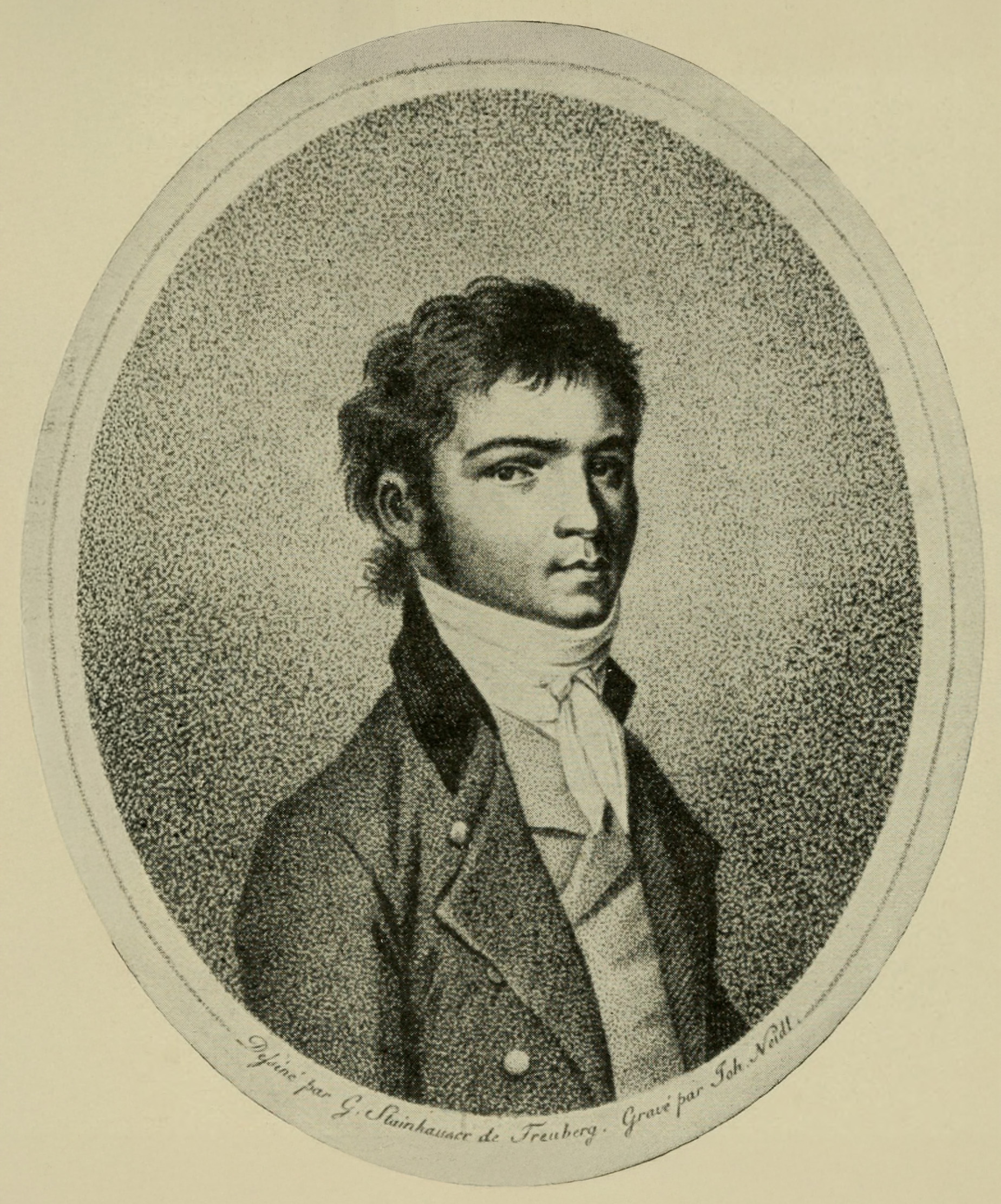
- Beethoven in 1796; designed by G. Stainhauser; engraving by Johann Josef Neidl, executed for the publisher Artaria
- Key: E♭ major
- Opus: 7
- Style: Classical period
- Form: Piano sonata
- Composed: 1796
- Dedication: Babette, Countess of Keglević
- Published: 1796, Vienna
- Publisher: Artaria
- Duration: 28 minutes
- Movements: 4
- I. Allegro molto con brio II. Largo con gran espressione III. Allegro IV. Rondo: Poco allegretto e grazioso Performed by Artur Schnabel in 1932

Ludwig van Beethoven's Piano Sonata No. 4, in E♭ major, Op. 7, sometimes nicknamed the Grand Sonata, was written in November 1796 and dedicated to his student Babette, the Countess Keglević. The sonata was composed during Beethoven's visit to the Keglevich Palace. Beethoven named it Great Sonata, because it was published alone, which was unusual for the time.

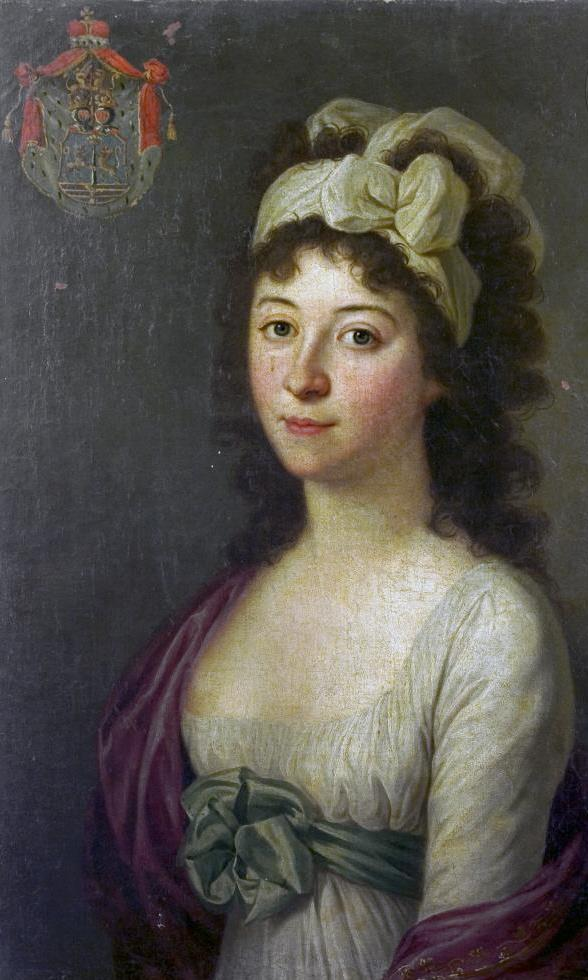
Babette, Countess of Keglević

Along with the Hammerklavier Sonata, it is one of the longest piano sonatas that Beethoven composed. A typical performance lasts about 28 minutes.

== Structure ==
The sonata is laid out in four movements:

1. Allegro molto e con brio, 6/8 (E♭ major)
2. Largo, con gran espressione, 3/4 (C major)
3. Allegro, 3/4 (E♭ major - Trio in E♭ minor)
4. Rondo: Poco allegretto e grazioso, 2/4 (E♭ major)

=== I. Allegro molto e con brio ===

The first movement is in sonata form.

=== II. Largo con gran espressione ===

The second movement is in ternary form.

=== III. Allegro ===

The third movement is in scherzo and trio form.

=== IV. Rondo: Poco allegretto e grazioso ===

The fourth movement is in rondo form. This movement of the sonata in particular was featured in the documentary Note by Note: The Making of Steinway L1037.
