= Jean Reboul =

French politician and poet

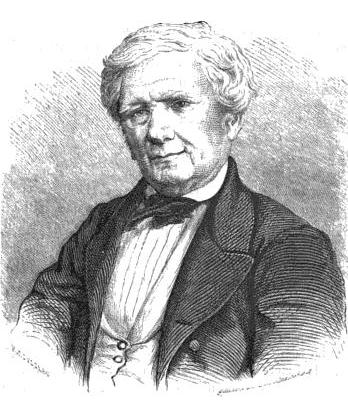
- Born: 3 January 1796
- Died: 28 May 1864 (aged 68)
- Writing career
- Language: Occitan
- Genre: poetry

Jean Reboul (23 January 1796 – 28 May 1864) was a French politician and poet of the Occitan language.

Reboul was born in Nîmes. He was a member of the French National Assembly. In 1836, Reboul's first poem "Poésies" was published with a preface by Alexandre Dumas and a letter from Alphonse de Lamartine.

Reboul died in Nîmes.
