= Thomas Haxby =

Thomas Haxby (25 January 1729 – 31 October 1796) was an English instrument maker, particularly of keyboard instruments, including harpsichords, pianos, and organs.

After an early career as a parish clerk at St Michael-le-Belfry in York, and as a singer at York Minster, he opened an instrument shop in York in 1756. During the late 1750s he acquired a reputation as an organ tuner and repairman, and began building organs as well as other instruments in the 1760s. His square pianos – of which he made between 24 and 36 per year, gradually increasing the number towards 1790 – are highly regarded. After his death his shop passed to his nephew and brother-in-law, who changed the name to Tomlinson & Son.
