= Piano Sonata No. 3 (Beethoven) =

Piano sonata by Beethoven

Piano Sonata No.3
- by Ludwig van Beethoven
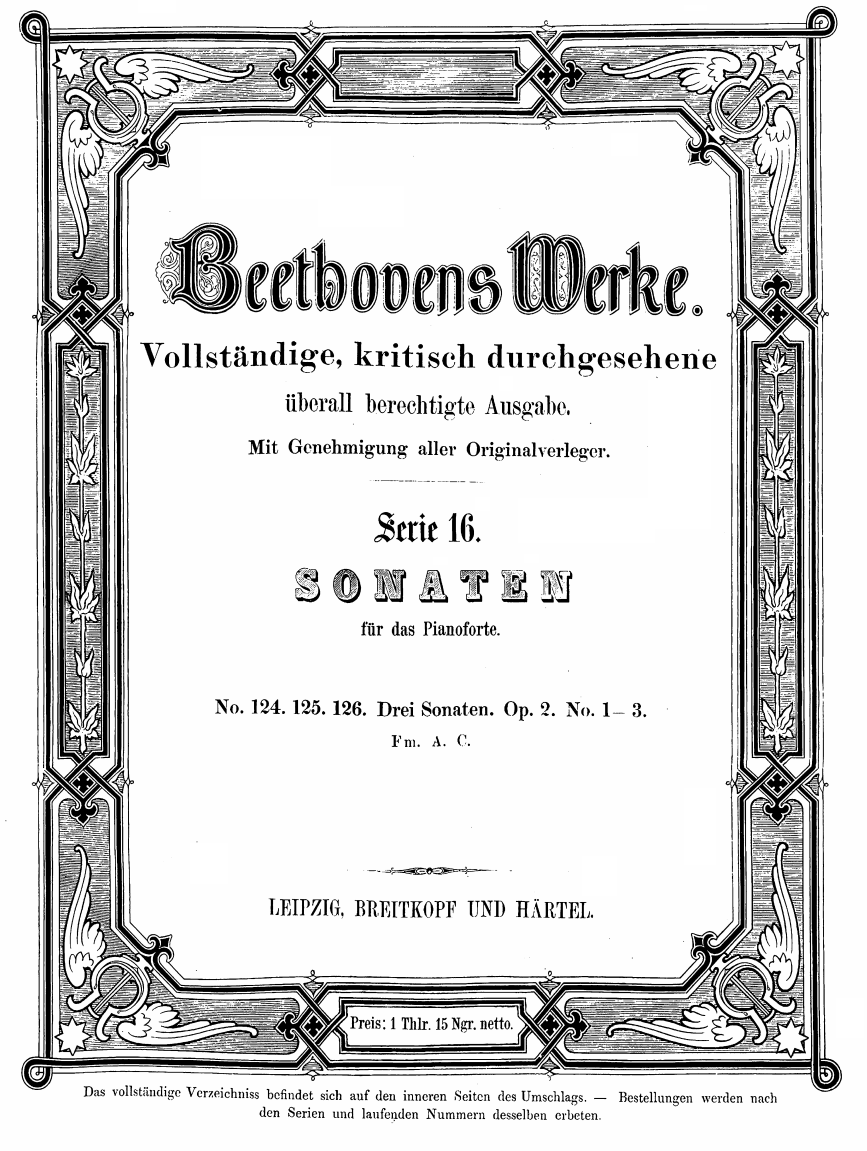
- Cover of 1862 edition of Beethoven's first three piano sonatas (Breitkopf & Härtel)
- Key: C major
- Opus: 2/3
- Style: Classical period
- Form: Piano sonata
- Composed: 1795
- Dedication: Joseph Haydn
- Published: 1796, Vienna
- Publisher: Artaria
- Duration: 25 minutes
- Movements: 4
- I. Allegro con brio II. Adagio III. Scherzo: Allegro IV. Allegro assai (5:22) Recorded c. 1932, performed by Artur Schnabel

Ludwig van Beethoven's Piano Sonata No. 3 in C major, Op. 2, No. 3, was written in 1795 and dedicated to Joseph Haydn. It was published simultaneously with his first and second sonatas in 1796.

The sonata is often referred to as one of Beethoven's earliest "grand and virtuosic" piano sonatas. All three of Beethoven's Op. 2 piano sonatas contain four movements, an unusual length at the time, which seems to show that Beethoven was aspiring towards composing a symphony. It is both the weightiest and longest of the three Op. 2 sonatas, and it presents many difficulties for the performer, including difficult trills, awkward hand movements, and forearm rotation. It is also one of Beethoven's longest piano sonatas in his early period. With an average performance lasting just about 24–26 minutes, it is second only to the Grand Sonata in E♭ Major, Op. 7, also published in 1796.

== Structure ==
The sonata, in C major, consists of four movements:

1. Allegro con brio,
2. Adagio, 2/4, E major
3. Scherzo: Allegro, 3/4
4. Allegro assai, 6/8

=== I. Allegro con brio ===
The first movement follows the sonata allegro form of the classical period, and borrows thematically from Beethoven's Piano Quartet No. 3 in C major, WoO 36, from a decade earlier. The movement opens with the main theme in the tonic key, beginning with a double-thirds trill-like pattern. This opening passage is infamous for pianists to play, and Arthur Rubinstein even used this passage to test pianos before performing on them. This pattern leads into an energetic outburst of a broken-chord and broken-octave section.

The second theme of the exposition begins in the key of G minor, and is repeated in D minor at measure 33. It is not until measure 47 that the traditional dominant key is finally reached, where a subsidiary theme in the second thematic group appears, marked "dolce." A forte shows later, leading to a very rich melody with left and right hand. Then a similar outburst of a broken-chord and broken-octave sections appears in fortissimo. Then it ends with some difficult trills and an octave scale.

Beethoven opens the development by improvising on trill patterns introduced in the end of the exposition, which are much more difficult to play. Following a broken-chords section filled with harmony changes, the main theme is restated in D major (pianissimo), the supertonic key of C major. Then a fortissimo and Beethoven's very common syncopations appear in the music giving a rhythm, this continues on to the resolution. Near the end of the movement is a rather remarkable cadenza, much in the style of a cadenza of a Classical piano concerto, which leads to a final statement of the opening motif.

The first movement is about 10 minutes long and is one of Beethoven's longest movements from his early period.

=== II. Adagio ===
The second movement is marked Adagio and written in the key of E major. It is in rondo form, A–B–A–C–A–coda, written in the style of a string quartet, as there are four clear voices. The middle section, in E minor, contains numerous examples of Romanticism, and is considered a prelude to the master's later sonatas. Later in the movement, the E minor passage is repeated in E major.

=== III. Scherzo: Allegro ===
The third movement, a scherzo, is written in minuet and trio form. It opens with a joke-like statement, and the composer uses some polyphony. The trio is in the relative minor key of C major (A minor) and contains running arpeggios in the right hand with the left hand playing a melodic line in octave form. The coda of this short movement ends the Scherzo softly with a tritone substitute authentic cadence.

=== IV. Allegro assai ===
The final movement, listed as a rondo, is in the sonata rondo form. The movement opens with an ascending run of first inversion chords in the right hand, which is the movement's main theme. Like the first movement, the second theme in the exposition is also written in G major. The great speed of this movement, combined with numerous examples of Beethoven's virtuoso skill such as the triple trill at the very end, makes it challenging for pianists.

In 1968, pianist Johnny Costa adapted Beethoven's opening run as the iconic introduction to the long-running television show Mister Rogers' Neighborhood.
