= Piano Sonata No. 2 (Beethoven) =

Composition by Ludwig van Beethoven

- by Ludwig van Beethoven
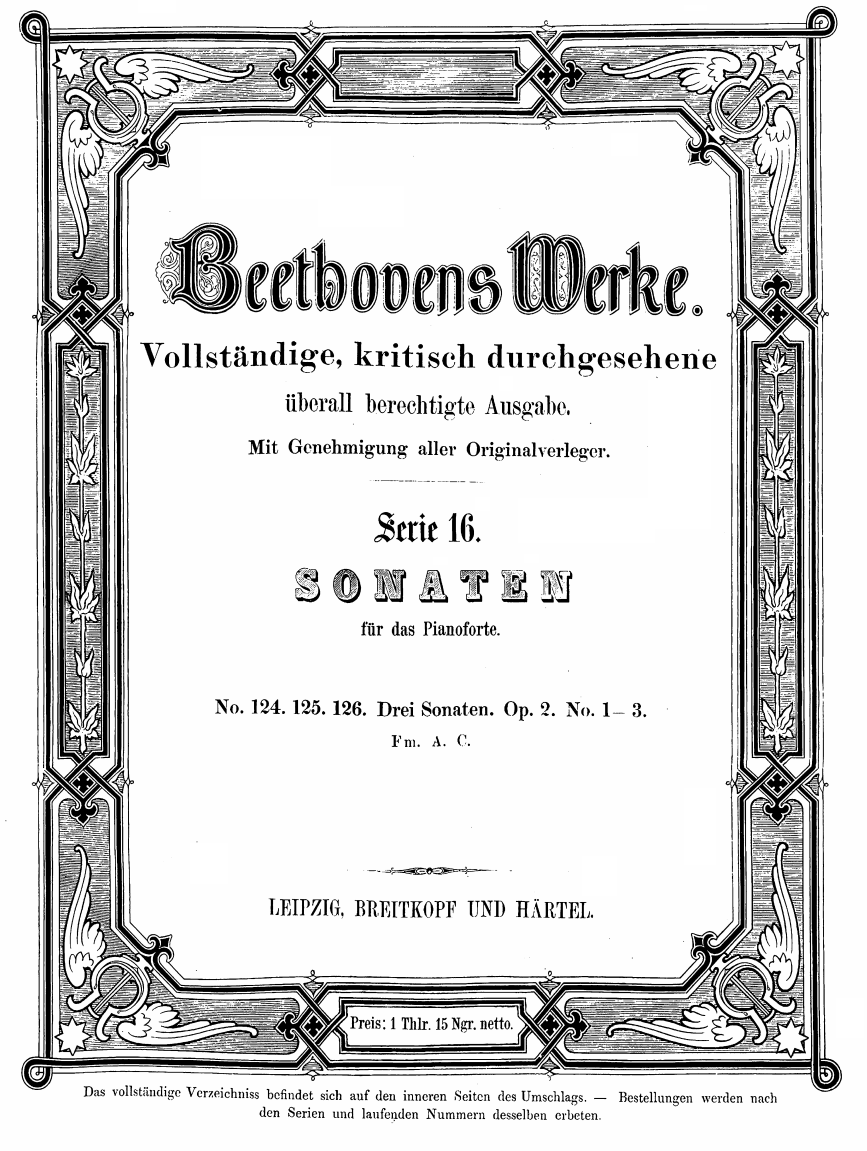
- Cover of 1862 edition of Beethoven's first three piano sonatas (Breitkopf & Härtel)
- Key: A major
- Opus: 2/2
- Style: Classical period
- Form: Piano sonata
- Composed: 1795
- Dedication: Joseph Haydn
- Published: 1796, Vienna
- Publisher: Artaria
- Duration: 22 minutes
- Movements: 4
- I. Allegro vivace II. Largo appassionato III. Scherzo: Allegretto IV. Rondo: Grazioso Recorded c. 1932, performed by Artur Schnabel

Ludwig van Beethoven's Piano Sonata No. 2 in A major, Op. 2, No. 2, was written in 1795 and dedicated to Joseph Haydn. It was published simultaneously with his first and third sonatas in 1796.

Donald Francis Tovey wrote, "The second sonata is flawless in execution and entirely beyond the range of Haydn and Mozart in harmonic and dramatic thought, except in the Finale."

A typical performance of the entire sonata lasts about 22 minutes.

== Structure ==
The sonata is laid out in four movements:

1. Allegro vivace, 2/4 (A major)
2. Largo appassionato, 3/4 (D major)
3. Scherzo: Allegretto, 3/4 (A major → A minor → A major)
4. Rondo: Grazioso, (A major)

=== I. Allegro vivace ===
The first movement is an athletic movement that has a bright disposition. The second theme of exposition contains some striking modulations for the time period. A large portion of the development section is in F major, which contains a third relationship with the key of the work, A major. A difficult, but beautiful canonic section is also to be found in the development. The recapitulation contains no coda and the movement ends quietly and unassumingly.

Tovey wrote, "The opening of the second subject in the first movement is a wonderful example of the harmonic principle previously mentioned...In all music, nothing equally dramatic can be found before the D minor sonata, Op. 31 No. 2 which is rightly regarded as marking the beginning of Beethoven's second period."

=== II. Largo appassionato ===
One of the few instances in which Beethoven uses the tempo marking Largo, which was the slowest such marking for a movement. The opening imitates the style of a string quartet and features a staccato pizzicato-like bass against lyrical chords. A high degree of contrapuntal thinking is evident in Beethoven's conception of this movement. The key is the subdominant of A major, D major.

Tovey wrote, "The slow movement shows a thrilling solemnity that immediately proves the identity of the pupil of Haydn with the creator of the 9th symphony."

=== III. Scherzo: Allegretto ===
A short and graceful movement that is in many respects similar to a minuet. This is the first instance in his 32 numbered sonatas in which the term "Scherzo" is used. The A minor trio section adds contrast to the cheerful opening material of this movement. Unusually, there is a second melody (not in the trio) in the remote key of G♯ minor.

=== IV. Rondo: Grazioso ===
A beautiful and lyrical rondo. The arpeggio that opens the repeated material becomes more elaborate at each entrance. The form of this rondo is A1–B1–A2–C–A3–B2–A4–Coda. The C section, in the parallel minor A minor, is rather agitated and stormy in comparison to the rest of the work, and is representative of the so-called "Sturm und Drang" style. A simple but elegant V^{7}–I perfect cadence closes the entire work in the lower register, played piano.
