= Piano Sonata No. 1 (Beethoven) =

Piano sonata composed by Ludwig van Beethoven

- by Ludwig van Beethoven
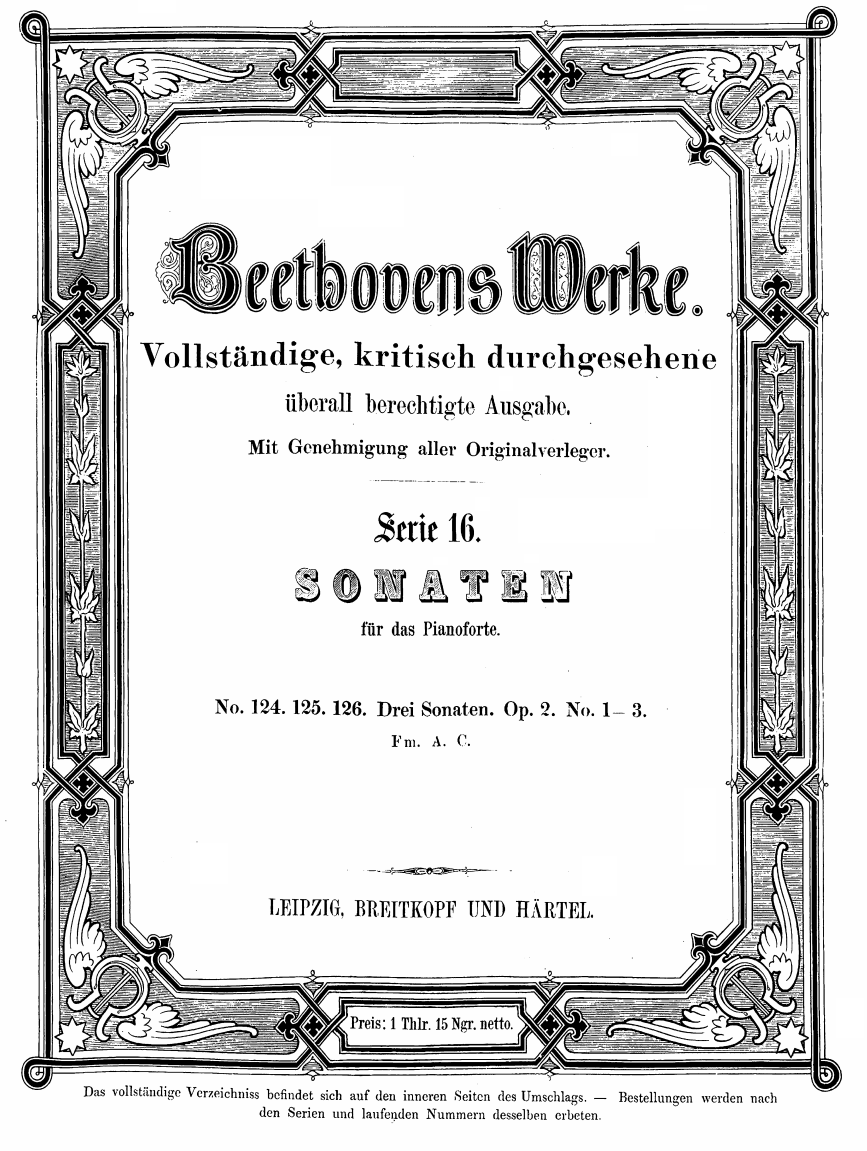
- Cover of 1862 edition of Beethoven's first three piano sonatas (Breitkopf & Härtel)
- Key: F minor
- Opus: 2/1
- Style: Classical period
- Form: Piano sonata
- Composed: 1795
- Dedication: Joseph Haydn
- Published: 1796, Vienna
- Publisher: Artaria
- Duration: 18 minutes
- Movements: 4
- I. Allegro II. Adagio III. Menuetto and Trio (Allegretto) IV. Prestissimo Recorded c. 1935, performed by Artur Schnabel

Ludwig van Beethoven's Piano Sonata No. 1 in F minor, Op. 2 No. 1, was written in 1795 and dedicated to Joseph Haydn. It was published simultaneously with his second and third piano sonatas in 1796.

Donald Francis Tovey wrote, "Sir Hubert Parry has aptly compared the opening of [this sonata] with that of the finale of Mozart's G minor symphony to show how much closer Beethoven's texture is. The slow movement ... well illustrates the rare cases in which Beethoven imitates Mozart to the detriment of his own proper richness of tone and thought, while the finale in its central episode brings a misapplied and somewhat diffuse structure in Mozart's style into a direct conflict with themes as Beethovenish in their terseness as in their sombre passion".

== Structure ==
The sonata is laid out in four movements:

1. Allegro (F minor)
2. Adagio (F major)
3. Menuetto – Allegretto (F minor – Trio in F major)
4. Prestissimo (F minor)

=== I. Allegro ===
The first movement, in cut time, is in the tonic key of F minor and in conventional sonata form, as was typical at Beethoven's time. A tense, agitated feel is ubiquitous throughout the movement.

The piece opens with an ascending arpeggiated figure (a so-called Mannheim Rocket, like that opening the fourth movement of Mozart's Symphony No. 40), culminating in a sixteenth-note triplet turn. This theme was used by Arnold Schoenberg for his initial example of sentence form. This subject is reiterated and increasingly shortened until reaching a climatic half cadence in measure 8. After a short intriguing fermata, the ascending-arpeggio motif is now introduced on the dominant minor key (C minor), played by the left hand. This is seamlessly continued by imitative sequences (mm. 9–14), effectively working as a transition preparing the secondary key (see sonata form).

An ascending bass progression leading to a half-close in the key of A♭ major is played three times (mm. 15–19) against syncopated descending thirds on the right hand, all of which unequivocally establishes A♭ major (the relative major of F minor) as the secondary key. (Using the relative major as secondary key is the most conventional procedure for minor-key sonata expositions.)

A new melodic subject based on a descending arpeggio is presented over a ceaseless dominant pedal in broken octaves (mm. 20–25). This subject clearly references the opening subject of the sonata, both being quarter-note arpeggios, whilst contrasting with it by inverting its contour (descending vs. ascending), articulation (legato vs. staccato) and harmony (outlining a dominant ninth chord as opposed to the tonic chord in the opening subject). This dual quality of unity and contrast achieved by using the same musical material in opposite ways (to articulate the tonic and secondary keys respectively), proved to be an effective device for Beethoven, which he would use again for his other much more famous piano sonata in F minor, Op. 57.

The second subject stays in A♭ major throughout, as would be expected of conventional sonata form, although it also hints its parallel minor key (A♭ minor). After sequencing iterations (mm. 26–31) of the 3-note motif that followed the descending arpeggio, the music seems to take off on a loud closing theme outlining a cadential progression (III^{6}, IV^{6}, V^{6}_{4}, V^{7}). which is played twice (mm. 33–40) and solidly resolves to an A♭ major chord. A little codetta (or cadence theme, mm. 41–48) echoing the second half of the opening subject (m. 2), again with shadings of A♭ minor, and eventually resolving in an emphatically perfect cadence (the first one so far). The exposition is repeated.

The development opens with the initial theme (mm. 49–54) in the secondary key, A♭ minor, but is mostly dedicated to the second subject and its eighth-note accompaniment (mm. 55–73), first in its original form, then exchanging roles between the hands. This goes through the relatively close keys of B♭ minor, C minor, B♭ minor and back to A♭ major, where it creates a sequence on the last two notes of the theme (mm. 73–80), going through a descending-fifths progression leading to a terse dominant pedal on C (mm. 81–92), preparing the return of the tonic key. A very quiet passage of mysterious-sounding suspensions follows (mm. 93–100), over which the exposition's transition material is reprised, serving as a retransition back to the opening material.

The recapitulation (mm. 101–145) starts loudly instead of quietly (a common device in Beethoven's early piano sonatas), and with many of the left-hand chords now happening on strong beats, unlike the syncopated exposition. Most events from the exposition are reprised in the same order, with slight changes of dynamics and voicings. Most significantly, all the material previously stated on the secondary key is now restated in the tonic, so that this time the final perfect cadence is heard on the tonic-key, giving a satisfying resolution to the key dichotomy in the exposition. To this end, the original transition to the secondary key is rewritten passing through the subdominant key and leading back to the tonic, which is a conventional procedure in classical sonata recapitulations.

At the end of the recapitulation, instead of giving the perfect cadence in the exact parallel location to that of the exposition, Beethoven delays the resolution for an extra 6 measures, during which two 'fake' attempts at a final resolution (in the subdominant and relative major keys, respectively) heighten anticipation for the 'true' cadence. The movement finishes on a fortissimo perfect cadence on F minor.

=== II. Adagio ===
The second movement is in ternary form (or sonata form without development). It opens with a highly ornamented lyrical theme in 3/4 time in F major (mm. 1–16). This is followed by a more agitated, 5-measure transitional passage in D minor (mm. 17–22) accompanied by quiet parallel thirds, followed by the second theme, a passage full of thirty-second notes in C major (mm. 23–31). This leads straight from the exposition to the recapitulation and to a more embellished form of the F major theme (mm. 32–47), which is followed by an F major variation of the second theme (mm. 48–55), which reaffirms F major as the key of the movement. Finally, there is a short coda (mm. 56–61).

This Adagio (along with two themes from his sonata Op. 2, No. 3) was the earliest composition by Beethoven now in general circulation; it was adapted from the slow movement of his Piano Quartet No. 3 in C major from 1785.

=== III. Menuetto and Trio (Allegretto) ===
The third movement, a minuet in F minor, is conventional in form. It contains two repeated sections, followed by a trio in F major in two repeated sections, after which the first minuet returns. The minuet is characterized by syncopations, dramatic pauses and sharp dynamic contrast, and like many minor-key minuets has a somewhat melancholy tone spanning major and minor tonality. The trio is built around longer, more lyric phrases that pass between the right and left hands in imitative polyphony. The main material is reprised (da capo) after the trio.

=== IV. Prestissimo ===
The fourth movement, like the first and third, is in the tonic-minor key (F minor), is in cut time and bears the tempo marking prestissimo ("very fast"). It has the form of a modified sonata-allegro movement, in which the development section has been replaced with a contrasting middle section (or episode).

The movement opens with fast triplet eighth-note arpeggios on the left hand, over which the main three-chord motif in staccato quarter notes is introduced two beats later (shown above). The eighth-note triplet figuration pervades throughout most of the exposition, alongside the main motif's character of "energetic, frantic pursuit of something elusive". A transitional passage (mm. 13–21) modulates to the dominant-minor key (C minor), where a more lyrical but still agitated theme is presented twice. It is noteworthy that Beethoven chose the dominant-minor key as the secondary key, instead of the more conventional relative major. The exposition closes emphatically on C minor (mm. 50–56), with iterations of the first subject chordal motif, and is repeated.

Instead of developing earlier material (as would be expected of a conventional allegro-sonata movement), the following middle section starts off with a peaceful new theme in the relative major key (A♭ major), thus compensating for its absence as the exposition's secondary key. This A♭ major theme is articulated in quarter-notes, providing a respite from the eighth-note triplets that pervaded most of the exposition. This major theme provides the answer to the rocket theme that opens the sonata (both ascending, one lyrical and major, the other percussive and minor). It is structured on compound-binary form, where both phrases are played twice each in slightly varied fashion.

This is followed by an extended retransition based on alternating motives from the exposition first subject and the middle-section theme. The recapitulation (mm. 138–192) reprises the whole exposition nearly identically (apart from very slight changes in dynamics and voicings), but significantly all the material is now re-stated in the tonic key (F minor), as would be expected of any conventional sonata form. The movement ends on a fortissimo eighth-note-triplet descending arpeggio, perhaps to give a symmetrical ending to a sonata that opened with a raising arpeggio.

The first edition (published in 1796) and other early editions direct the performer to repeat the second section. However, Donald Francis Tovey thought that following the repeat sounded "very crude".
