= Klien =

Klien is a surname. Notable people with the surname include:

- Christian Klien (born 1983), Austrian racing driver
- Erika Giovanna Klien (1900–1957), artist and art educator
- Hermann Klien (born 1932), Austrian gymnast
- Michael Klien (born 1973), choreographer and artist
- Paula Klien, Brazilian artist
- Walter Klien (1928–1991), Austrian pianist
