= Sonata theory =

Approach in musical theory

Sonata Theory is an approach to the description of sonata form in terms of individual works' treatment of generic expectations. For example, it is normative for the secondary theme of a minor-mode sonata to be in either the key of III or v. If a composer chooses to break this norm in a given piece, that is a deviation that requires analytical and interpretive explanation. The essentials of the theory are presented by its developers, James Hepokoski and Warren Darcy, in the book Elements of Sonata Theory, which won the Society for Music Theory's Wallace Berry Award in 2008. Although the theory is particularly designed to treat late-eighteenth-century works such as those by Mozart, Haydn, and Beethoven, many of its principles are applicable to works in sonata form from later centuries.

== Methodology ==
Rather than attempt to prescribe a set of rules to which all pieces in sonata form must adhere, sonata theory seeks to demonstrate that sonata form is "a constellation of normative and optional procedures that are flexible in their realization." A work in sonata form is expected to accomplish certain goals; how it goes about this task is to be understood in relation to a set of background stylistic tendencies. The theory, then, understands the sonata as an example of dialogic form: the compositional choices that create an individual piece of music are in dialogue with generic norms and expectations. A large component of the theory is therefore a reconstruction of what these norms were, based on an extensive study of the late-eighteenth-century repertoire.

Central to this undertaking are the notions of defaults and deformations. At any point in a sonata movement, such as at the beginning of the secondary theme or the end of the development, a composer had various choices for how to proceed. The most typical option, or the first level default, might be bypassed in favor of a second (or lower level) default. For example, developments most frequently begin by recalling the exposition's primary theme in a new key, but a development might also begin episodically by introducing new material, which Hepokoski and Darcy posit "may be a second-level default option." On the other hand, a composer might choose for this moment of the piece to behave in a genuinely atypical way. This is what Sonata Theory terms a "deformation" of normal practice. The term deformation is not meant to suggest an aesthetic judgment (along the lines of "malformed") but rather is intended as a technical term indicating a significant deviation from ordinary practice. Indeed, deformational moments are often the most unusual, interesting, and pleasing aspects of a work: "Deformations are compositional surprises, engaging forays into the unexpected. But the paradox of art is that the nature of the game at hand also and always includes the idea that we are to expect the unexpected." A central part of the analytic and interpretive work of Sonata Theory lies in recognizing these deformations and default choices and understanding how they affect the progress of a piece as a whole.

From the perspective of the theory, sonata form engages two principal levels of compositional design: tonal and rhetorical. The tonal layout of sonata form has frequently been described by theorists, and involves a motion from the tonic to a secondary key in the exposition, answered by a return and solidification of the tonic later in the piece (usually in the recapitulation). The rhetorical form, on the other hand, concerns the manner in which themes, textures, and musical ideas are presented; it "includes personalized factors of design and ad hoc expression: modular and textural layout, selection and arrangement of musical topics, varieties of structural punctuation, and so on." A key consideration of the theory in this regard is the rotational layout of the usual sonata design. An exposition usually presents a number of differing musical ideas in a specific order. Later sections of the piece (such as the development, recapitulation, and coda) usually revisit these ideas in the same order—though not necessarily touching on every one—as if rotating through a pre-set sequence, like hours on a clock or channels on a television dial. A recapitulation under this theory is specifically a rotation that coincides with a restoration of the tonic key.

== Key concepts ==
Sonata Theory understands the rhetorical layout of a sonata as progressing through a set of action spaces and moments of "structural punctuation." These action spaces largely correlate with the "themes" or "groups" of the sonata, though each space is differentiated primarily by the unique generic goal that the music pursues within that particular space. The exposition lays out each space, establishing a rotational order which the recapitulation also follows. Frequently the development will only articulate a subset of these action spaces, moving only through a partial rotation, although fully rotational, entirely episodic, and non-rotational developments also occur.

The primary theme (P) zone or space presents the initial musical material of the sonata, excluding an optional introduction which is not considered part of the sonata form proper. One function of this space is to define the main (or tonic) key of the piece, usually confirming it with a cadence at the end of the theme. Generically, however, the sonata is required to depart from this home key for the later action spaces, so the tonic proposed by P is only provisional; one of the main generic goals of the following sonata form is to eventually affirm this key with a more definitive cadence. A second function of P material is to signal the initiation of one of the sonata's rotations. As P falls at the beginning of the rotational layout and usually consists of distinctive musical material, every subsequent occurrence of that material suggests the beginning of a new rotation.

The transition (TR) follows P, sometimes emerging seamlessly out of it. The chief goal of TR is to build up energy, although TR also frequently modulates away from the tonic to prepare the sonata's secondary key. The most common goal for the transition's energy gain is to drive to the first moment of "structural punctuation," the medial caesura. If this option is chosen, a Two-Part Exposition is produced; if not, TR leads directly to the essential expositional closure (described below), producing a Continuous Exposition.

The medial caesura (MC or ’), if present, is an abrupt gap in the musical texture, either a complete gap in sound or covered over by light "filler" material. The MC is often triggered by repeated, declamatory ("hammer blow") chords and follows either a half cadence or authentic cadence in the tonic or secondary key. (The first level default is to build an MC around a half cadence in the new key; by far the least common option is to set the MC up by an authentic cadence in the tonic.) This moment of punctuation serves one purpose: to announce the impending arrival of the sonata's secondary theme. According to Sonata Theory, a piece cannot have a secondary theme without an MC to prepare it (except in highly deformational circumstances): the medial caesura is a necessary generic marker of the second theme. This is the meaning of the term "Two-Part Exposition:" sonata expositions including a medial caesura are articulated into primary and secondary themes. Those without proceed "continuously" from beginning to closure.

If prepared by a medial caesura, the secondary theme (S) begins in the exposition's new key (normatively V for major mode sonatas and III or v for minor mode ones). Often, and with increasing frequency in the nineteenth century, (but by no means exclusively) the secondary theme is marked by a quieter, more lyrical character than the energetic TR that preceded it. The main objective of the S action space, however, is to confirm the new key with a perfect authentic cadence. This cadence is the overarching goal of a sonata exposition, and its equivalent moment in the recapitulation is the chief goal of the sonata form as a whole. Thus S space is often characterized by dramatic methods of delaying this cadential arrival. (One common manner in which this is accomplished is the articulation of an apparent second medial caesura, producing what Sonata Theory terms a Trimodular Block.)

The authentic cadence that S-space strives for is the essential expositional closure (EEC), the second main moment of structural punctuation in an exposition. (The equivalent moment in a recapitulation is the essential structural closure (ESC).) Usually, the EEC is provided by the first perfect authentic cadence articulated after S-space has begun, although this can be undermined in various ways (such as repeating previously heard material from S, implying that the previous cadence was somehow insufficient and S-space needs to "try again"). Thus the EEC is conventionally defined as "the first satisfactory perfect authentic cadence that proceeds onward to differing material." The EEC confirms the new key proposed by S; it is the generic goal of the exposition as a whole. Likewise, the ESC in the recapitulation confirms the key of S in the recapitulation, which is now the tonic. Thus the ESC confirms the piece's tonic as a whole, solidifying the tonal promise first made by P in the exposition.

In approaching the ESC in the recapitulation, the crux will appear as the rejoining of expositional material within the TR or S zones. This usually happens after alterations (recompositions) in the P or TR zones. The crux will be signified by correspondence measures (measures that parallels the exposition). The crux may, however, appear in the subdominant, or simultaneously with S or the ESC. The entire sonata form, therefore, is understood as a dynamic trajectory toward the ESC, the basic plan of which is foreshadowed by the exposition's approach to the EEC. This teleology is central to Sonata Theory's conception of the dramatic and expressive potential of sonata form as a whole. The crux is the part of the recapitulation where the S zone secures itself in the home key and significant changes compared to the exposition no longer occur.

Following the EEC or ESC, a composer can append a closing (C) zone that reinforces the key of the cadence. Often this involves further authentic cadences after the EEC, even ones that are more rhetorically forceful, but they serve only to reinforce the closure attained by the EEC. By the definition of the "essential closure" cadences, C must involve musical material that differs from what was heard in S. In fact, C space often includes distinctly new thematic material.

The entire layout of a Two-Part Exposition is thus often represented as:

P TR ’ S ↓ C

(Arrows are frequently used in Sonata Theory notation to represent authentic cadences—in this case the EEC.)

== Sonata types ==
One fundamental choice that composers had in constructing a sonata form was how many rotations to employ. Sonata Theory recognizes five different Types of sonatas based on their rotational distribution. (The selection of sonata type is independent of the piece's internal rotational layout: a sonata of any type might have either a Continuous or a Two-Part exposition, for example.)

The Type 1 Sonata is a bi-rotational structure: it includes only an exposition, followed immediately (or perhaps after a short link) by a recapitulation. This type, frequently employed in slow movements, therefore lacks a traditional development section. This is often referred to as sonatina form outside of theory circles.

The Type 2 Sonata is also bi-rotational, but the design of its second rotation is more complicated. Type 2 sonatas replace the beginning of the rotation with material similar to a traditional development, which segues back into the normal rotational sequence between the TR and the MC; thus oftentimes the restoration of the tonic key in Rotation 2 is accomplished by the arrival of S. This has led other analysts to apply the term "reversed recapitulation" to this sonata type, though it can be argued as a variant of binary form.

The Type 3 Sonata is the traditional textbook design, including full exposition, development, and recapitulation, each of which has its own independent rotational design (although developments are often only half-rotational).

The Type 4 Sonata describes structures that others have referred to as sonata rondos. The key aspects of this sonata type include a retransition (RT) that concludes every rotation (following C space), a second (developmental) rotation that begins with P in the tonic, and an obligatory P-based coda following the recapitulation.

The Type 5 Sonata is the design employed by the first movement of most eighteenth-century concertos and is the most complicated sonata design. Although great variation exists between individual Type 5 movements, the most characteristic features of the Type 5 are an extra, initial, non-modulatory rotation for the orchestra alone and an alternation between blocks of music for the soloist and for the orchestra.

== Sources ==
- Hepokoski, James; Darcy, Warren (2006). Elements of Sonata Theory: Norms, Types, and Deformations in the Late-Eighteenth-Century Sonata. Oxford: Oxford University Press. doi:10.1093/acprof:oso/9780195146400.001.0001. ISBN 978-0-19-514640-0.
