= Symphony No. 2 (Strauss) =

Symphony by Richard Strauss

- Symphony by Richard Strauss
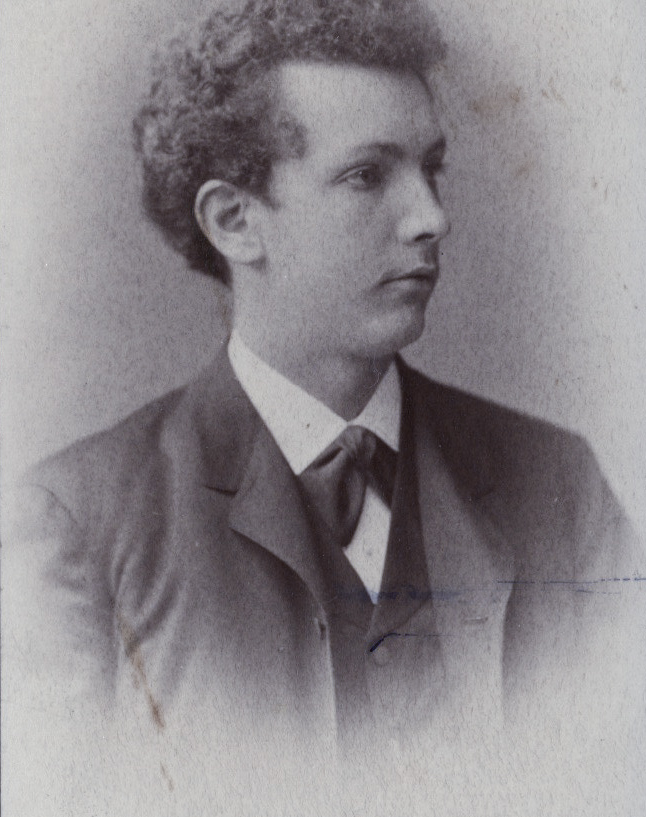
- Richard Strauss the year after the premiere of the F minor Symphony
- Key: F minor
- Catalogue: TrV 126
- Opus: 12
- Composed: 1885

The Symphony No. 2 in F minor was written by Richard Strauss between 1883 and 1884. It is sometimes referred to as just Symphony in F minor. He gave it the Opus number 12, and it also appears in other catalogues as TrV 126 and Hanstein A.I.2. It is not listed in von Asow's catalog.

== History ==
The symphony was premiered by Theodore Thomas conducting the New York Philharmonic on 13 December 1884. The European premiere, with Strauss himself conducting, took place in October 1885 (on the same night he was the soloist in Mozart's Piano Concerto No. 24, K. 491, with his own cadenza). In 1887, he played it again with the Leipzig Gewandhaus Orchestra. The work has been performed only once at the BBC Proms, in the 1905 season on 1 September at the Queen's Hall with Henry Wood conducting the New Queens Hall Orchestra.

== Music ==
The symphony is written for a standard orchestra consisting of 2 flutes, 2 oboes, 2 clarinets in B♭, 2 bassoons, 4 horns in F, 2 trumpets in F and C, 3 trombones, tuba, timpani, and strings.

The symphony is in the usual four movements, though the scherzo and slow movement are switched from their usual positions, as in Beethoven's Symphony No. 9:

1. Allegro ma non troppo, un poco maestoso, F minor, 2/4
2. Scherzo: Presto, A♭ major, 3/4 with Trio in C minor
3. Andante cantabile, C major, 3/8
4. Finale: Allegro assai, molto appassionato, F minor switching to F major,

The first movement is a sonata form allegro with three themes. The ways Strauss develops his material in this symphony owes much to Beethoven's middle period music, in particular "the slow movement of the Seventh Symphony (in the chromatically inflected stepwise descent at mm. 139—43 of the first movement), the development of the Eroica, first movement (repeated tutti pounding of a single dissonance, in movement one, mm. 193—99), and the Egmont Overture, this time in the same key (intensification through repetition of rising motive over dominant harmony, in movement four, mm. 346—49)." The recapitulation section is unusual in that it modulates to A-flat major for the second subject group rather than staying in tonic or going to the parallel major; modulating to the mediant major in a minor-key sonata form movement is typically expected in the exposition.

The scherzo was successful and had to be repeated both times Strauss conducted the symphony in Milan in 1887.

A transitional brass motif from the first movement intrudes in the lyricism of the slow movement.

The main theme of the fourth movement is "an agitated low-string melody rising beneath tremolo and sounding very much like Bruckner." Near the end, about halfway between rehearsal letters T and U, Strauss recalls themes from the previous three movements, though the Andante is recalled second and the Scherzo third. Bruckner's Symphony No. 3, in its 1873 version, also recalls themes from the previous movements in the finale at an analogous point.

== Reception ==
Johannes Brahms's initial reaction to the piece was two words: "ganz hübsch" ("quite nice"). Later he elaborated his advice, encouraging Strauss to "take a good look at Schubert's dances," to guard against "thematic irrelevances," and that there "is no point in this piling up of many themes which are only contrasted rhythmically on a single triad." Béla Bartók's Concerto for Orchestra contains "an interesting resemblance between a canon for trumpets and horns in three pairs a quaver apart in the slow movement and the canon for brass in the first movement," something which was first noticed by Theodore Bloomfield.

Although Strauss's musical style moved on from his second symphony, he did occasionally program it later in his life, for example conducting it on 28 February 1899 in Heidelberg, and again on 29 January 1903 with the Royal Concertgebouw Orchestra in Amsterdam. On 5 November 1935, he also made a radio broadcast with the Berlin Radio Symphony Orchestra. Strauss recorded some of his own compositions, but this symphony was not among them and the 1935 radio broadcast recording is currently lost. The few conductors to record this symphony are Michael Halasz, Neeme Järvi, Karl Anton Rickenbacher, Hiroshi Wakasugi and Sebastian Weigle. A version for piano duet has also been recorded.
