= Walter Klien =

Austrian pianist

Walter Klien (27 November 1928 – 9 February 1991) was an Austrian pianist.

Walter Klien on concert tour 1977. Dedicated to Southern Africa tour organiser Hans Adler

== Career ==
Klien was born in Graz in 1928. His mother was the artist Erika Giovanna Klien (1900-1957). She emigrated to the United States in 1929, and their only further contact was by correspondence.

Klien studied piano with Josef Dichler at the Music Academy in Vienna and with Arturo Benedetti Michelangeli. He also studied composition with Paul Hindemith.

He was a laureate of the Busoni Competition in Bolzano and the Marguerite Long Competition in Paris and made his debut in the United States in 1969. In 1953 he had been awarded the Bösendorfer Prize in Vienna.

Shortly before his death from cancer in 1991 (which occurred shortly before a planned visit to Australia), he was honoured with the Joseph Marx Music Prize in 1987 and the gold medal of the city of Vienna in 1989.

== Recordings ==
His discography is large, and much of it has been reissued on CD or is available in download format. It includes the complete solo piano works and many of the piano concertos of Mozart, much of the piano music of Brahms, and the complete piano sonatas of Schubert. He partnered with Arthur Grumiaux in recording the Mozart music for piano and violin, and with Rena Kyriakou in the complete piano music of Chabrier.

He performed and recorded piano duo and duet repertoire with his wife Beatriz Klien and with his Graz contemporary Alfred Brendel.

He was much admired for his crystalline tone and projection of detail in his interpretations. His clarity of playing suited the music of Mozart and Schubert in particular. These qualities are also very evident in his Brahms recordings, where the dense textures of the writing can easily obscure the musical argument. Critics continue to regard his complete Schubert sonatas as among the finest ever recorded, not least for their unique Viennese lilt and unaffected ease.
