= Three-key exposition =

Musical exposition used in sonata form

In music, the three-key exposition is a particular kind of exposition used in sonata form.

Normally, a sonata form exposition has two main key areas. The first asserts the primary key of the piece, that is, the tonic. The second section moves to a different key, establishes that key firmly, arriving ultimately at a cadence in that key. For the second key, composers normally chose the dominant for major-key sonatas, and the relative major (or less commonly, the minor-mode dominant) for minor-key sonatas. The three-key exposition moves not directly to the dominant or relative major, but indirectly via a third key; hence the name.

== Examples ==
- A very early example appears in the first movement of Haydn's String Quartet in D major, Op. 17 No. 6: the three keys are D major, C major, and A major. (C major is prepared by a modulation to its relative minor A minor, which happens to be the dominant minor of the original key.)
- Ludwig van Beethoven wrote a number of sonata movements during the earlier part of his career with three-key expositions. For the "third" (that is, the intermediate) key, Beethoven made various choices: the dominant minor (Piano Sonata No. 2, Op. 2 no. 2; String Quartet No. 5, Op. 18 no. 5), the supertonic minor (Piano Sonata No. 3, Op. 2 no. 3), and the relative minor (Piano Sonata No. 7, Op. 10 no. 3). Later, Beethoven used the supertonic major (Piano Sonata No. 9, Op. 14 no. 1, Piano Sonata No. 11, Op. 22), which is only a mild sort of three-key exposition, since the supertonic major is the dominant of the dominant, and commonly arises in any event as part of the modulation. As he entered his so-called "middle period," Beethoven abandoned the three-key exposition. This was part of a general change in the composer's work in which he moved closer to the older practice of Haydn, writing less discursive and more closely organized sonata movements.
- Franz Schubert, who liked discursive forms for the entirety of his short career, also employed the three-key expositions in many of his sonata movements. A famous example is the first movement of the Death and the Maiden Quartet in D minor, in which the exposition moves to F major and then A minor (translated to D major and minor respectively in the recapitulation), a formula that is repeated in the final movement; another is the Violin Sonata in A major (in which the second theme appears in G major and B major, while only the closing passage of the exposition is in the dominant, E major). His B major piano sonata, D 575, even uses a four-key exposition (B major, G major, E major, F♯ major): this key scheme is literally transposed up a fourth for the recapitulation. The finale of his sixth symphony (D 589) is an even more extreme case: its exposition passes from C major to G major by way of A♭ major, F major, A major, and E♭ major, making a six-key exposition.
- Felix Mendelssohn followed the Death and the Maiden example in the first movement of his second Piano Trio, in which the E♭ major second theme gives way to a G minor close (transposed to C major and minor in the recapitulation).
- The first movement of Frédéric Chopin's Piano Concerto in F minor also has a three-key exposition (F minor, A♭ major, C minor).
- The first movement of the second cello sonata by Brahms also employs a three-key exposition moving to C major and then A minor, the exposition of the first movement of the String Sextet in B♭ involves an intervening theme in A major before reaching F, and the Piano Quartet in G minor involves secondary themes in D minor and major respectively (the first of these being omitted in the recapitulation and the second transposed to E♭ major moving back to G minor). The D minor violin sonata has a final movement that moves through a calm second theme in C major before closing the exposition in A minor.
