= Sonata form =

Musical structure of three main sections

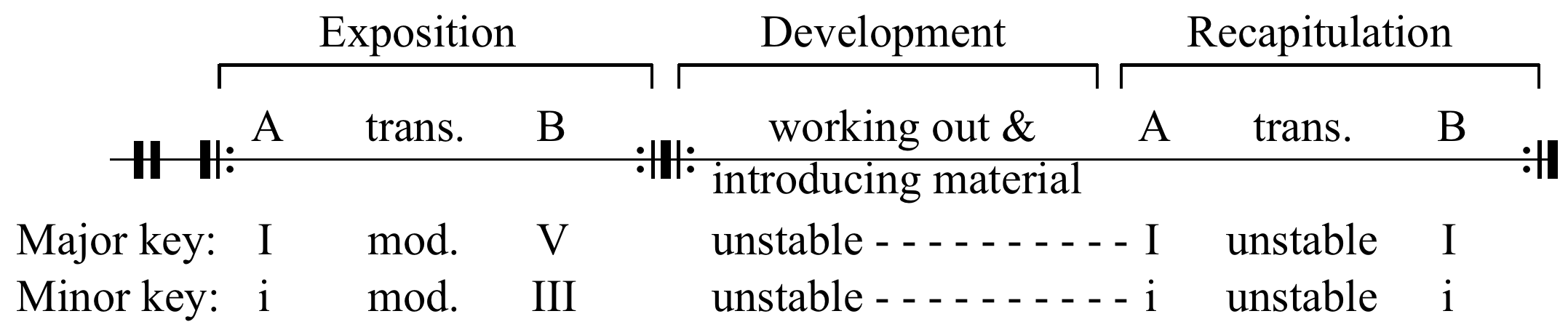
Early examples of sonata form resemble two-reprise continuous ternary form.

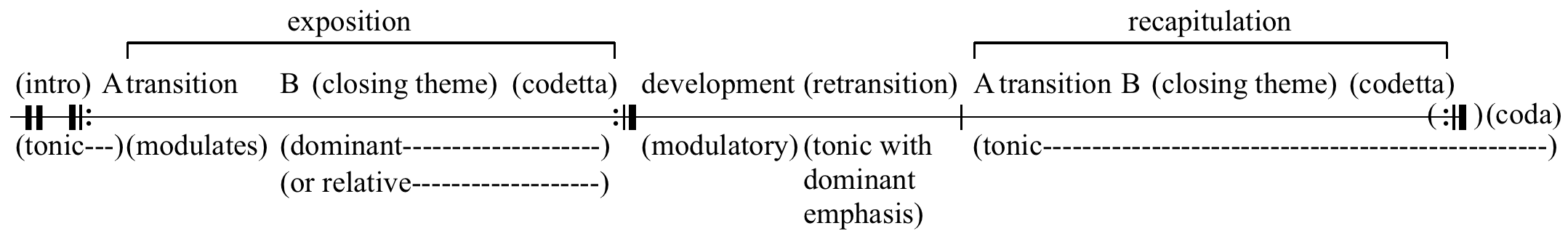
Sonata form, optional features in parentheses

The sonata form (also sonata-allegro form or first movement form) is a musical structure generally consisting of three main sections: an exposition, a development, and a recapitulation. It has been used widely since the middle of the 18th century (the early Classical period).

While it is typically used in the first movement of multi-movement pieces, it is sometimes used in subsequent movements as well—particularly the final movement. The teaching of sonata form in music theory rests on a standard definition and a series of hypotheses about the underlying reasons for the durability and variety of the form—a definition that arose in the second quarter of the 19th century. There is little disagreement that on the largest level, the form consists of three main sections: an exposition, a development, and a recapitulation; however, beneath this general structure, sonata form is difficult to pin down to a single model.

The standard definition focuses on the thematic and harmonic organization of tonal materials that are presented in an exposition, elaborated and contrasted in a development and then resolved harmonically and thematically in a recapitulation. In addition, the standard definition recognizes that an introduction and a coda may be present. Each of the sections is often further divided or characterized by the particular means by which it accomplishes its function in the form.

After its establishment, the sonata form became the most common form in the first movement of works entitled "sonata", as well as other long works of classical music, including the symphony, concerto, string quartet, and so on. Accordingly, there is a large body of theory on what unifies and distinguishes practice in the sonata form, both within and between eras. Even works that do not adhere to the standard description of a sonata form often present analogous structures or can be analyzed as elaborations or expansions of the standard description of sonata form.

== Defining 'sonata form' ==
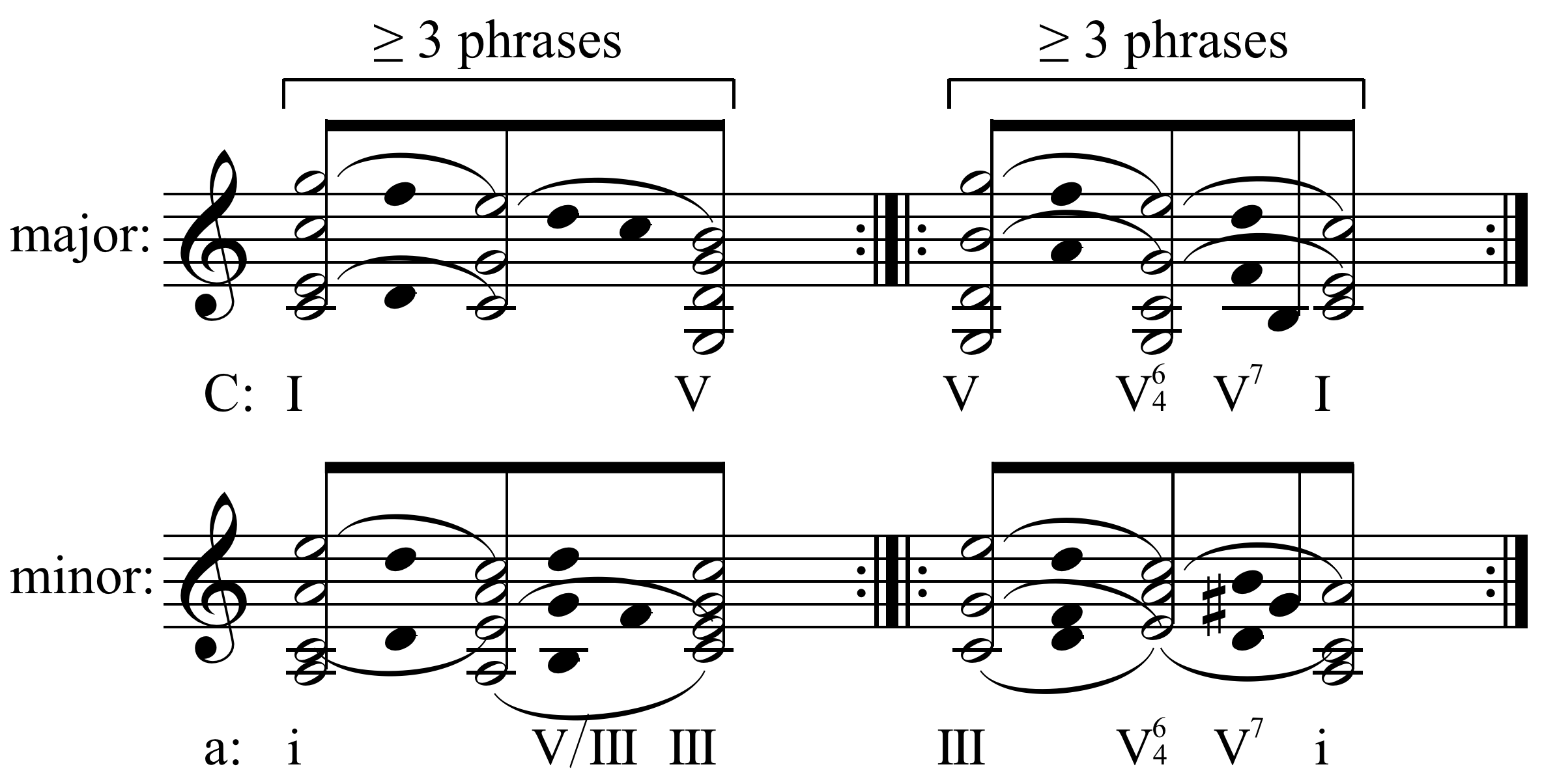
Baroque binary forms roots in sonata form

According to the Grove Dictionary of Music and Musicians, sonata form is "the most important principle of musical form, or formal type, from the Classical period well into the 20th century". As a formal model it is usually best exemplified in the first movements of multi-movement works from this period, whether orchestral or chamber, and has, thus, been referred to frequently as "first-movement form" or "sonata-allegro form" (since the typical first movement in a three- or four-movement cycle will be in allegro tempo). However, as what Grove, following Charles Rosen, calls a "principle"—a typical approach to shaping a large piece of instrumental music—it can be seen to be active in a much greater variety of pieces and genres, from minuet to concerto to sonata-rondo. It also carries with it expressive and stylistic connotations: "sonata style"—for Donald Tovey and other theorists of his time—was characterized by drama, dynamism, and a "psychological" approach to theme and expression.

Although the Italian term sonata often refers to a piece in sonata form, it is important to separate the two. As the title for a single-movement piece of instrumental music, sonata—the past participle of suonare, "to play [an instrument]", as opposed to cantata, the past participle of cantare, "to sing"—covers many pieces from the Baroque and mid-18th century that are not "in sonata form". Conversely, in the late 18th century or "Classical" period, the title "sonata" is typically given to a work composed of three or four movements. Nonetheless, this multi-movement sequence is not what is meant by sonata form, which refers to the structure of an individual movement.

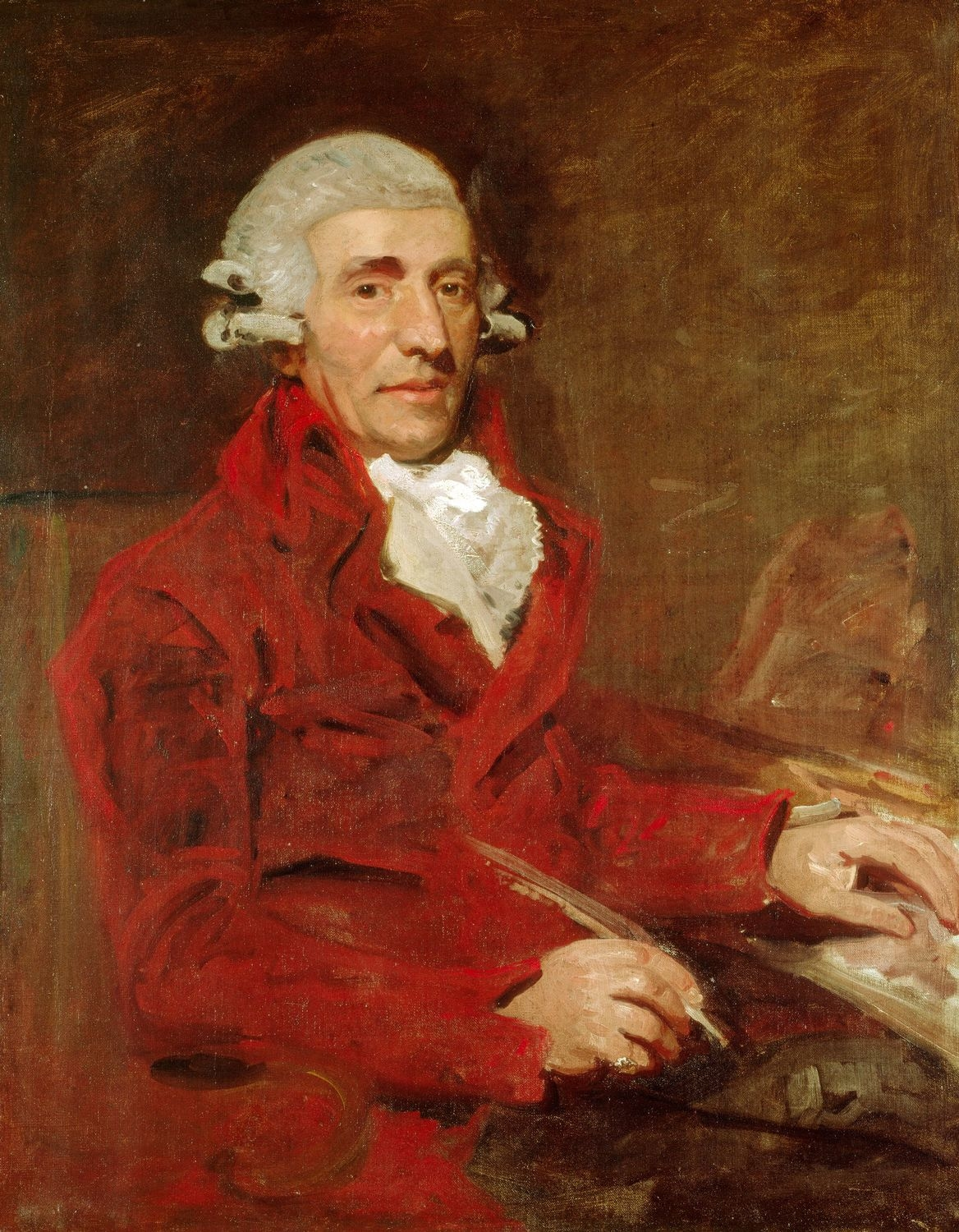
Haydn as portrayed by John Hoppner in England in 1791

The definition of sonata form in terms of musical elements sits uneasily between two historical eras. Although the late 18th century witnessed the most exemplary achievements in the form, above all from Joseph Haydn and Wolfgang Amadeus Mozart, a compositional theory of the time did not use the term "sonata form". Perhaps the most extensive contemporary description of the sonata-form type of movement may have been given by the theorist Heinrich Christoph Koch in 1793: like earlier German theorists and unlike many of the descriptions of the form we are used to today, he defined it in terms of the movement's plan of modulation and principal cadences, without saying a great deal about the treatment of themes. Seen in this way, sonata form was closest to binary form, out of which it probably developed.

The model of the form that is often taught currently tends to be more thematically differentiated. It was originally promulgated by Anton Reicha in Traité de haute composition musicale in 1826, by Adolf Bernhard Marx in Die Lehre von der musikalischen Komposition in 1845, and by Carl Czerny in 1848. Marx may be the originator of the term "sonata form". This model was derived from the study and criticism of Beethoven's piano sonatas.

== Definition as a formal model ==
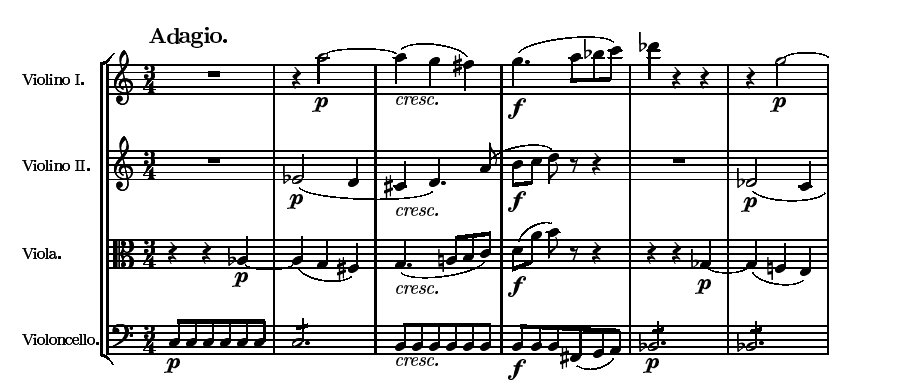
The opening of Mozart's "Dissonance" Quartet, K. 465, which begins with an introduction

A sonata-allegro movement is divided into sections. Each section is felt to perform specific functions in the musical argument.

- It may begin with an introduction, which is, in general, slower than the main movement.
- The first required section is the exposition. The exposition presents the primary thematic material for the movement: one or two themes or theme groups, often in contrasting styles and in opposing keys, connected by a modulating transition. The exposition typically concludes with a closing theme, a codetta, or both.
- The exposition is followed by the development where the harmonic and textural possibilities of the thematic material are explored.
- The development then re-transitions back to the recapitulation where the thematic material returns in the tonic key, and for the recapitulation to complete the musical argument, material that has not been stated in the tonic key is "resolved" by being played, in whole or in part, in the tonic.
- The movement may conclude with a coda, beyond the final cadence of the recapitulation.

The term 'sonata form' is controversial and has been called misleading by scholars and composers almost from its inception. Its originators implied that there was a set template to which Classical and Romantic composers aspired, or should aspire. However, sonata form is currently viewed as a model for musical analysis, rather than compositional practice. Although the descriptions on this page could be considered an adequate analysis of many first-movement structures, there are enough variations that theorists such as Charles Rosen have felt them to warrant the plural in 'sonata forms'.

These variations include, but are not limited to:

- a monothematic exposition, where the same material is presented in different keys, often used by Haydn;
- a 'third subject group' in a different key than the other two, used by Schubert (e.g. in the String Quintet, D. 956), and Bruckner's Symphony No. 4;
- the first subject recapitulated in the 'wrong' key, often the subdominant, as in Mozart's Piano Sonata No. 16 in C, K. 545 and Schubert's Symphony No. 5;
- the second subject group recapitulated in a key other than the tonic, as in Richard Strauss's Symphony No. 2;
- and an extended coda section that pursues developmental, rather than concluding, processes, often found in Beethoven's middle-period works, such as his Symphony No. 3.

Through the Romantic period, formal distortions and variations become so widespread (Mahler, Elgar and Sibelius among others are cited and studied by James Hepokoski) that 'sonata form' as it is outlined here is not adequate to describe the complex musical structures that it is often applied to.

In the context of the many late-Baroque extended binary forms that bear similarities to sonata form, sonata form can be distinguished by the following three characteristics:

- a separate development section including a retransition
- the simultaneous return of the first subject group and the tonic
- a full (or close to full) recapitulation of the second subject group

== Outline of sonata form ==
The standard description of the sonata form is:

=== Introduction ===
The introduction section is optional, or may be reduced to a minimum. If it is extended, it is, in general, slower than the main section and frequently focuses on the dominant key. It may or may not contain material that is later stated in the exposition. The introduction increases the weight of the movement (such as the famous dissonant introduction to Mozart's "Dissonance" Quartet, K. 465), and also permits the composer to begin the exposition with a theme that would be too light to start on its own, as in Haydn's Symphony No. 103 ("The Drumroll") and Beethoven's Quintet for Piano and Winds, Op. 16. The introduction usually is not included in the exposition repeat: the Pathétique is a possible counterexample. Much later, Chopin's Piano Sonata No. 2 (Op. 35) is a clear example where the introduction is also included.

On occasion, the material of introduction reappears in its original tempo later in the movement. Often, this occurs as late as the coda, as in Mozart's String Quintet in D major, K. 593, Haydn's "Drumroll" Symphony, Beethoven's Piano Sonata No. 8 ("Pathétique"), or Schubert's Symphony No. 9 ("Great"). Sometimes it can appear earlier: it occurs at the beginning of the development in the Pathétique Sonata, and at the beginning of the recapitulation of Schubert's Symphony No. 1.

=== Exposition ===
Haydn's Keyboard Sonata, Hob. XVI: G1, I

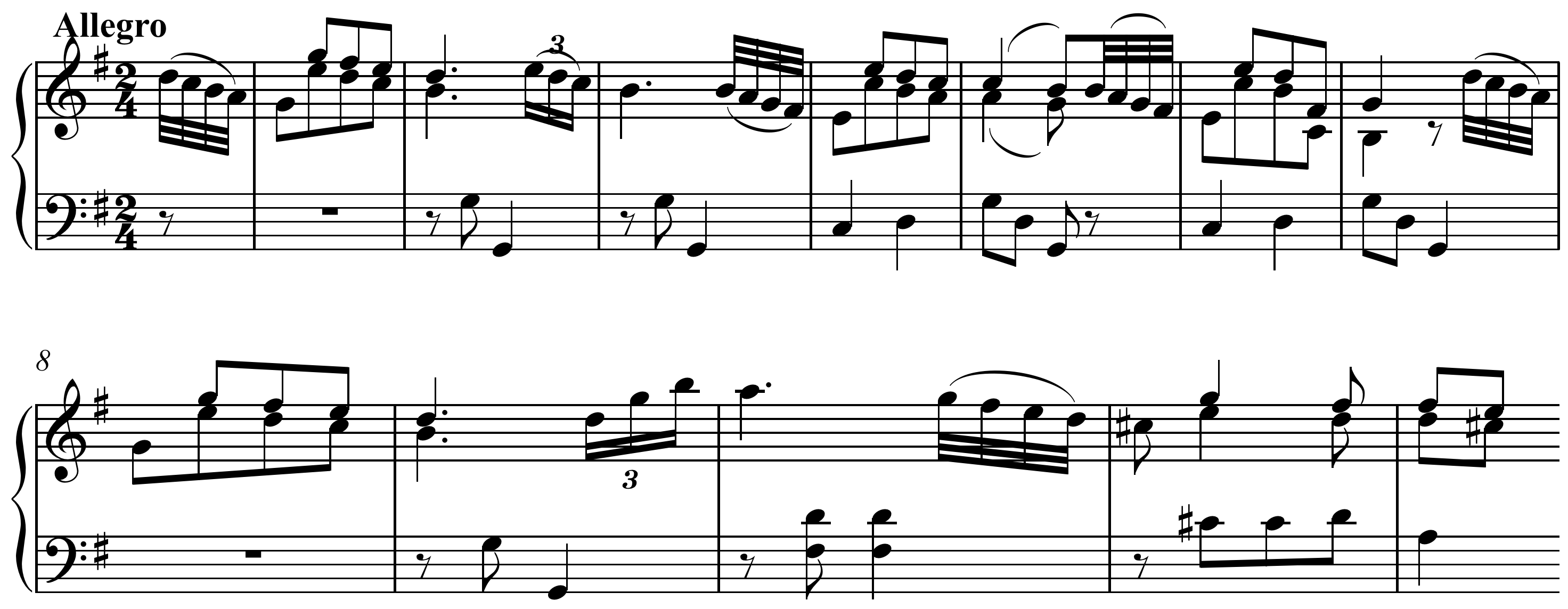
First theme (G major) and transition from counterstatement (to D major), mm. 1–12

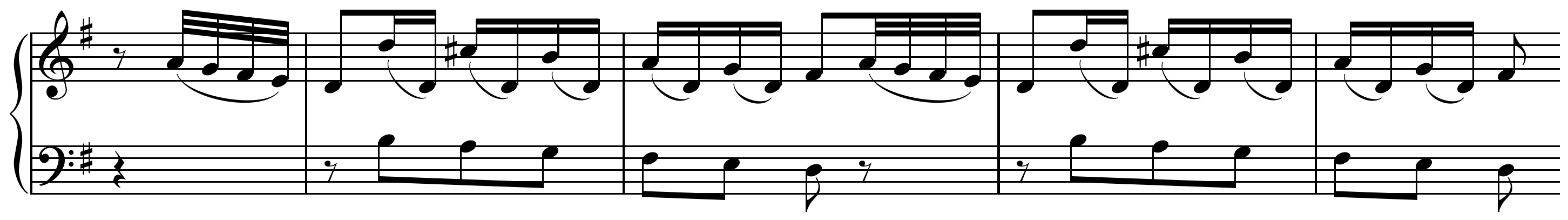
Start of second subject (D major), mm. 13–16

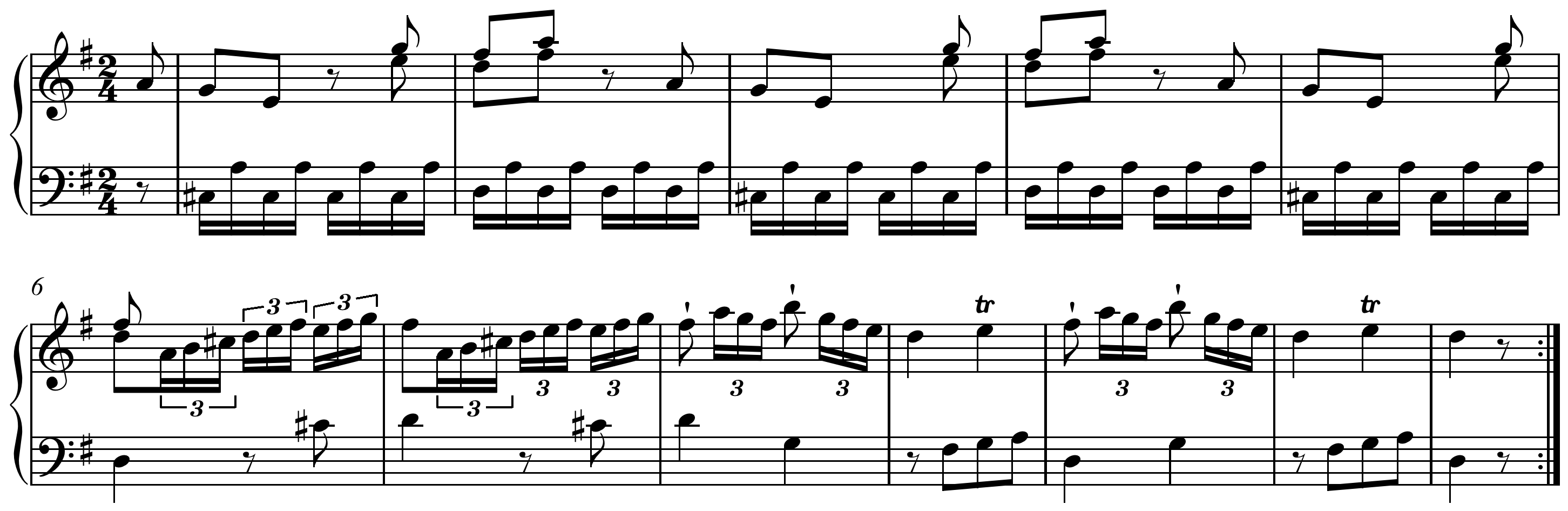
End of second subject and Codetta (D major), mm. 17–28

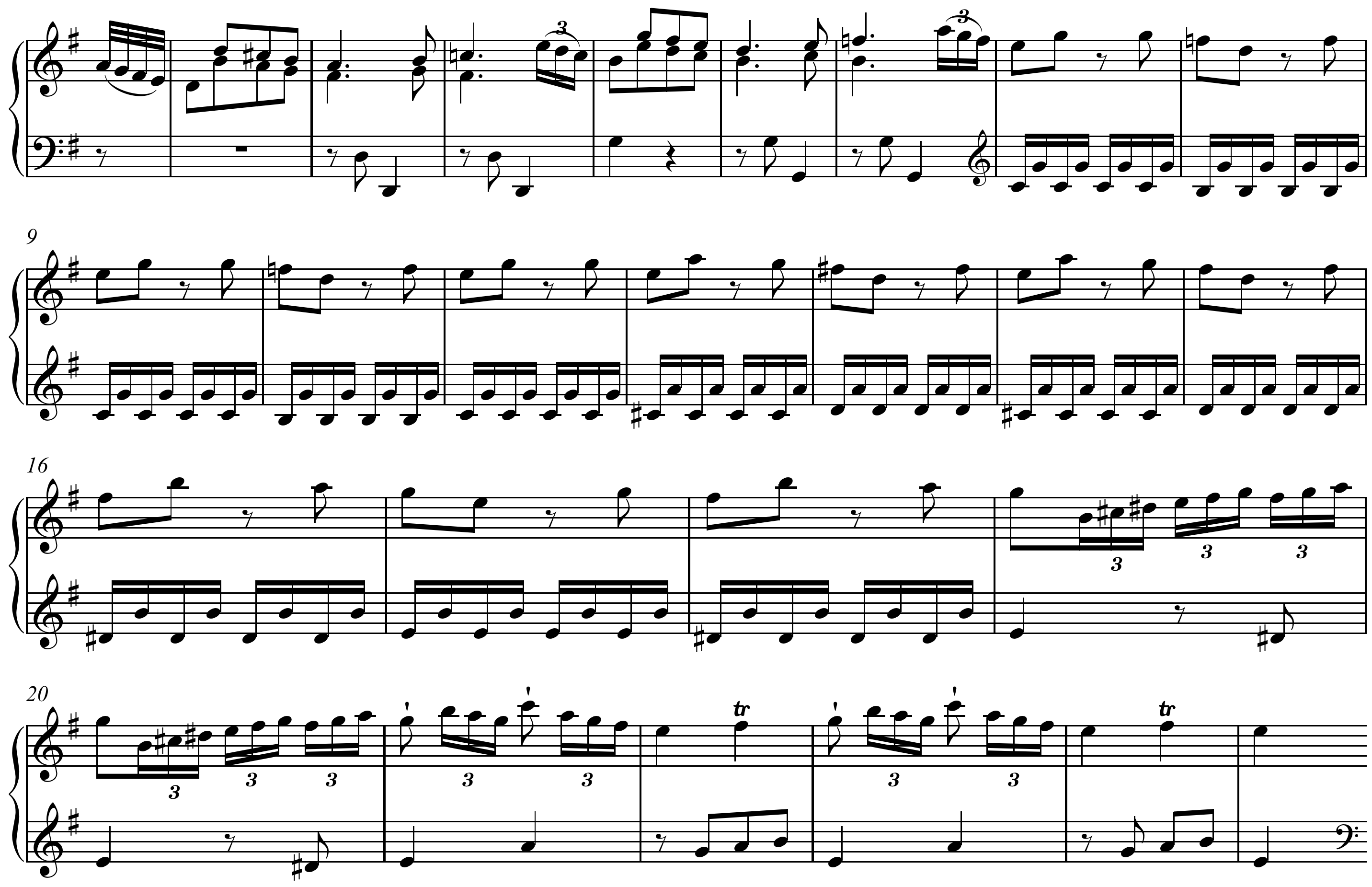
Development, mm. 29–53

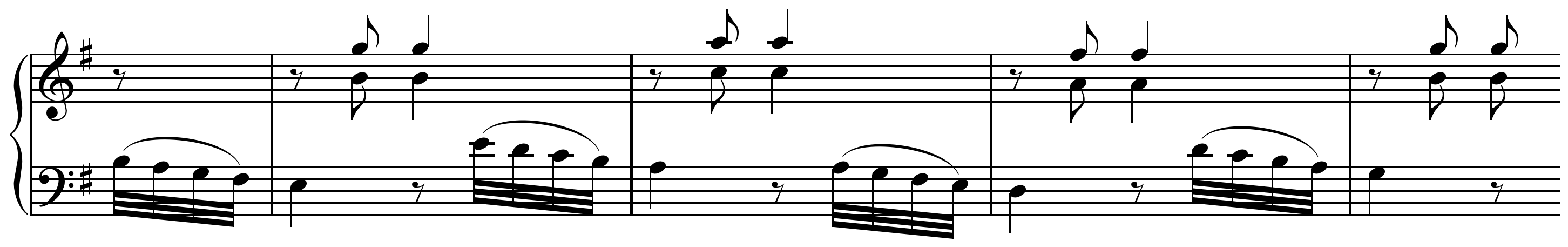
Retransition, mm. 54–57

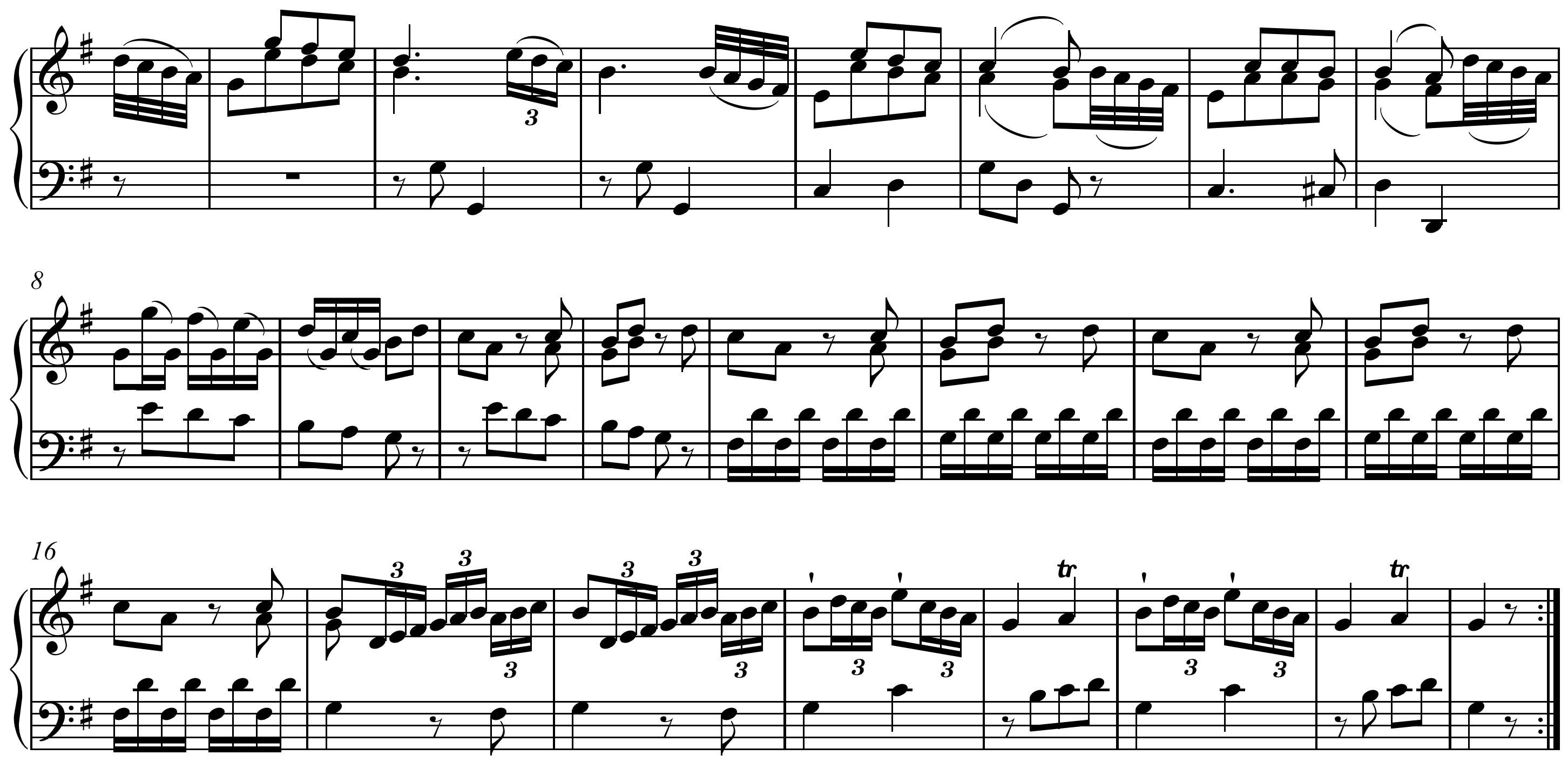
Recapitulation, mm. 58–80

The primary thematic material for the movement is presented in the exposition. This section can be further divided into several sections. The same section in most sonata form movements has prominent harmonic and thematic parallelisms (although in some works from the 19th century and onward, some of these parallelisms are subject to considerable exceptions), which include:

- First subject group, P (Primary) – this consists of one or more themes, all in the tonic key. Although there are exceptions, most pieces follow this form.
- Transition, T – in this section the composer modulates from the key of the first subject to the key of the second. If the first group is in a major key, the second group will usually be in the dominant key. However, if the first group is in a minor key, the second group will usually be the relative major.
- Second subject group, S – one or more themes in a different key (typically the dominant) from the first group. The material of the second group is often different in rhythm or mood from that of the first group (frequently, it is more lyrical) and is often stated at a piano dynamic.
- Closing zone (or closing area), C – a suffix after the end of the second subject group that reinforces the new key area. C involves musical material that differs from what was heard in S, and often includes distinctly new thematic material.

The exposition is commonly repeated, particularly in classical and early romantic works, and more likely in solo or chamber works and symphonies than for concerti. Often, though not always, first and second endings are employed during the last measure(s) of the exposition. The first ending to point back to the tonic, where the exposition began, and the second ending to point towards the development.

=== Development ===
In general, the development starts in the same key as the exposition ended, and may move through many different keys during its course. It will usually consist of one or more themes from the exposition altered and on occasion juxtaposed and may include new material or themes—though exactly what is acceptable practice is a point of contention. Alterations include taking material through distant keys, breaking down of themes and sequencing of motifs, and so forth.

The development varies greatly in length from piece to piece and from time period to time period, sometimes being relatively short compared to the exposition (e.g., the first movement of Eine kleine Nachtmusik) and in other cases quite long and detailed (e.g., the first movement of the "Eroica" Symphony). Developments in the Classical era are typically shorter due to how much composers of that era valued symmetry, unlike the more expressive Romantic era in which development sections gain a much greater importance. However, it almost always shows a greater degree of tonal, harmonic, and rhythmic instability than the other sections. In a few cases, usually in late Classical and early Romantic concertos, the development section consists of or ends with another exposition, often in the relative minor of the tonic key.

At the end, the music will usually return to the tonic key in preparation of the recapitulation. (On occasion, it will actually return to the sub-dominant key and then proceed with the same transition as in the exposition.) The transition from the development to the recapitulation is a crucial moment in the work. The last part of the development section is called the retransition: It prepares for the return of the first subject group in the tonic.

Exceptions include the first movement of Brahms's Piano Sonata No. 1. The general key of the movement is C major, and it would then follow that the retransition should stress the dominant seventh chord on G. Instead, it builds in strength over the dominant seventh chord on C, as if the music were proceeding to F major, only to take up immediately the first theme in C major. Another exception is the fourth movement of Schubert's Symphony No. 9. The home key of the movement is C major. The retransition prolongates over the dominant chord on G, but suddenly takes up the first theme in the flattened mediant E♭ major.

A particularly common exception is for the dominant to be substituted with the dominant of the relative minor key: one example is the first movement of Haydn's String Quartet in E major, Op. 54 No. 3.

Occasionally, the retransition can begin with a false recapitulation, in which the opening material of the first theme group is presented before the development has completed. The surprise that ensues when the music continues to modulate toward the tonic can be used for either comic or dramatic effect. An example occurs in the first movement of Haydn's String Quartet in G major, Op. 76 No. 1.

=== Recapitulation ===
The recapitulation is an altered repeat of the exposition, and consists of:

- First subject group – normally given prominence as the highlight of a recapitulation, it is usually in exactly the same key and form as in the exposition.
- Transition – often the transition is carried out by introducing a novel material: a kind of an additional brief development. It is called a "secondary development".
- Second subject group – usually in roughly the same form as in the exposition, but now in the home key, which sometimes involves change of mode from major to minor, or vice versa, as occurs in the first movement of Mozart's Symphony No. 40 (K. 550). More often, however, it may be recast in the parallel major of the home key (for example, C major when the movement is in C minor like Beethoven's Symphony No. 5 in C Minor, op. 67/I). Key here is more important than mode (major or minor); the recapitulation provides the needed balance even if the material's mode is changed, so long as there is no longer any key conflict.

Exceptions to the recapitulation form include Mozart and Haydn works that often begin with the second subject group when the first subject group has been elaborated at length in the development. If a theme from the second subject group has been elaborated at length in the development in a resolving key such as the tonic major or minor or the subdominant, it may also be omitted from the recapitulation. Examples include the opening movements of Mozart's piano sonata in C minor, K. 457, and Haydn's String Quartet in G major, Op. 77 No. 1.

After the closing cadence, the musical argument proper is said to be completed harmonically. If the movement continues, it is said to have a coda.

=== Coda ===
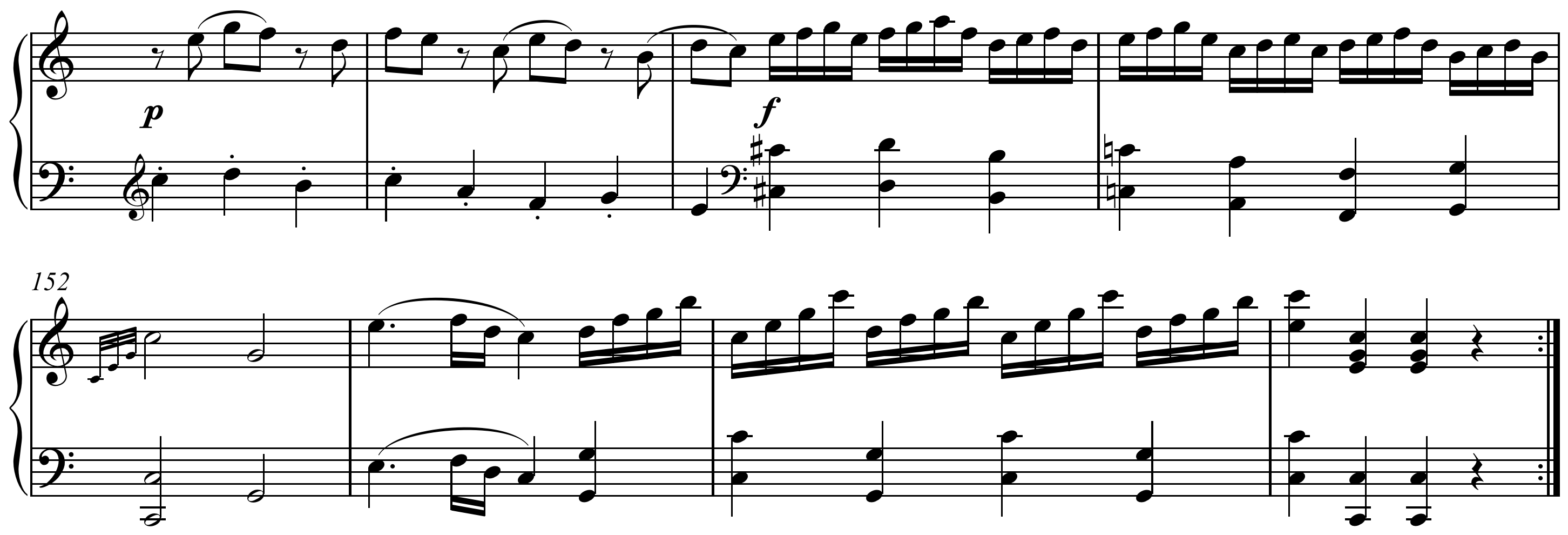
The coda to Mozart's Sonata in C Major, K. 309, I, mm. 152–155; last bars of recapitulation also presented for context

The coda is optional in Classical-era works, but became essential in many Romantic works. After the final cadence of the recapitulation, the movement may continue with a coda that will contain material from the movement proper. Codas, when present, vary considerably in length, but like introductions are not generally part of the "argument" of the work in the Classical era. Codas became increasingly important and essential parts of the sonata form in the nineteenth century. The coda often ends with a perfect authentic cadence in the original key. Codas may be quite brief tailpieces, typically in the Classical era, or they may be very long and elaborate. An example of the more extended type is the coda to the first movement of Beethoven's Eroica Symphony, and an exceptionally long coda appears at the end of the finale of Beethoven's Symphony No. 8.

Explanations for why an extended coda is present vary. One reason may be to omit the repeat of the development and recapitulation sections found in earlier sonata forms of the 18th century. Indeed, Beethoven's extended codas often serve the purpose of further development of thematic material and resolution of ideas left unresolved earlier in the movement. Another role that these codas sometimes serve is to return to the minor mode in minor-key movements where the recapitulation proper concludes in the parallel major, as in the first movements of Beethoven's Symphony No. 5 or Schumann's Piano Concerto, or rarely, to restore the home key after an off-tonic recapitulation, such as in the first movements of Brahms's Clarinet Quintet and Dvořák's Symphony No. 9.

== Variations on the standard schema ==
=== Monothematic expositions ===
It is not necessarily the case that the move to the dominant key in the exposition is marked by a new theme. Haydn in particular was fond of using the opening theme, often in a truncated or otherwise altered form, to announce the move to the dominant, as in the first movement of his Sonata Hob. XVI/49 in E♭ major. Mozart also occasionally wrote such expositions: for instance in the Piano Sonata K. 570 or the String Quintet K. 593. Such expositions are often called monothematic, meaning that one theme serves to establish the opposition between tonic and dominant keys. This term is misleading, since most "monothematic" works have multiple themes: most works so labeled have additional themes in the second subject group. Rarely, as in the fourth movement of Haydn's String Quartet in B♭ major, Op. 50, No. 1, did composers perform the tour de force of writing a complete sonata exposition with just one theme. A more recent example is Edmund Rubbra's Symphony No. 2.

The fact that so-called monothematic expositions usually have additional themes is used by Charles Rosen to illustrate his theory that the Classical sonata form's crucial element is some sort of dramatization of the arrival of the dominant. Using a new theme was a very common way to achieve this, but other resources such as changes in texture, salient cadences and so on were also accepted practice.

=== No transitions between the first and second subject groups ===
In some sonata-form works, especially in the Classical period, there is no transitional material linking the subject groups. Instead, the piece moves straight from the first subject group to the second subject group via common-tone modulation. This happens in the first movement of Mozart's Symphony No. 31 and again in the third movement of his Symphony No. 34. It also occurs in the first movement of Beethoven's Symphony No. 1. In the exposition, the first subject group ends on a half-cadence in tonic, and the second subject group immediately follows in the dominant key (without a transition).

=== Expositions that modulate to other keys ===
The key of the second subject may be something other than the dominant (for a major-mode sonata movement) or relative major (for a minor-key movement). A second option for minor-mode sonata form movements was to modulate to the minor dominant; this option, however, robs the sonata structure of the space of relief and comfort that a major-mode second theme would bring, and was therefore used primarily for a bleak, grim effect, as Beethoven did with some frequency. Mendelssohn also did this in the first movement of his Symphony No. 3 and the last movement of his Symphony No. 4.

A minor-key sonata form movement can also modulate to the major dominant, as in the first movements of Tchaikovsky's Symphony No. 1 and Brahms's Symphony No. 4.

About halfway through his career, Beethoven also began to experiment with other tonal relationships between the tonic and the second subject group. The most common practice, for Beethoven and many other composers from the Romantic era, was to use the mediant or submediant, rather than the dominant, for the second group. For instance, the first movement of the "Waldstein" sonata, in C major, modulates to the mediant E major, while the opening movement of the "Hammerklavier" sonata, in B♭ major, modulates to the submediant G major, and String Quartet No. 13 in the same key modulating to the flattened submediant key of G♭ major. Tchaikovsky also implemented this practice in the last movement of his Symphony No. 2; the movement is in C major and modulates to the flattened submediant A♭ major. The young Chopin even experimented with expositions that do not modulate at all, in the opening movements of his Piano Sonata No. 1 (remaining in C minor throughout) and his Piano Concerto No. 1 (moving from E minor to E major).

Beethoven began also to use the submediant major with more frequency in minor-key sonata-form movements, as in the first movements of Symphony No. 9, Piano Sonata No. 32, and String Quartets No. 11 and No. 15. The latter case transposes the second repeat of its exposition by a fifth, starting on the minor dominant (instead of the tonic) and finishing on the major mediant (instead of the submediant). The first movement of Richard Strauss's Symphony No. 2, in F minor, modulates to the submediant D♭ major, as do the F minor first movements of Brahms' first clarinet sonata and piano quintet; all three works balance this downward third by moving up to the major mediant (A♭ major) for the key of the second movement.

Rarely, a major-mode sonata form movement will modulate to a minor key for the second subject area, such as the mediant minor (Beethoven Sonata Op. 31/1, i), the relative minor (first movements of Beethoven Triple Concerto and Brahms Piano Trio No. 1) or even the minor dominant (Brahms Piano Concerto No. 2, i). In such cases, the second theme will often return initially in the tonic minor in the recapitulation, with the major mode restored later on.

During the late Romantic period, it was also possible to modulate to remote tonal areas to represent divisions of the octave. In the first movement of Tchaikovsky's Symphony No. 4, the first subject group is in the tonic F minor but modulates to G♯ minor and then to B major for the second subject group. The recapitulation begins in D minor and modulates to F major, and goes back to the parallel F minor for the coda.

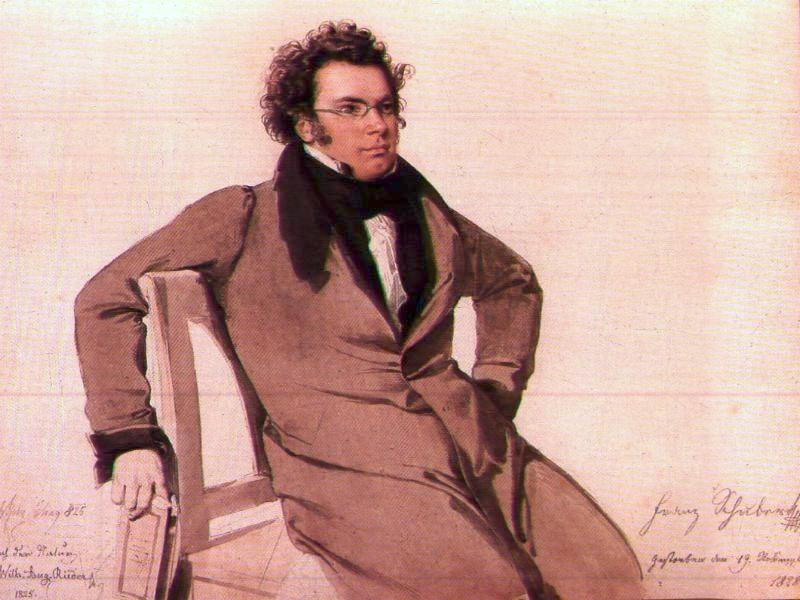
Watercolour of Franz Schubert, who is known for using three-key expositions

=== Expositions with more than two key areas ===
The exposition need not only have two key areas. Some composers, most notably Schubert, composed sonata forms with three or more key areas (see three-key exposition). The first movement of Schubert's Quartet in D minor, D. 810 ("Death and the Maiden"), for example, has three separate key and thematic areas, in D minor, F major, and A minor. Similarly, Chopin's Piano Concerto in F minor uses F minor, A♭ major, and C minor in its first movement's exposition. In both cases, the transition is i–III–v, an elaboration of the minor schema of either using i–III or i–v. This is by no means the only scheme, however: the opening movement of Schubert's Violin Sonata in G minor, D. 408, uses the scheme i–III–VI, and the opening movement of Schubert's Symphony No. 2 in B♭ major, D. 125, uses the scheme I–IV–V. The first movement of Tchaikovsky's Symphony No. 5 uses the scheme i–v–VII. An extreme example is the finale to Schubert's Symphony No. 6, D. 589, which has a six-key exposition (C major, A♭ major, F major, A major, E♭, and G major), with a new theme for each key.

The second subject group can start in a particular key and then modulate to that key's parallel major or minor. In the first movement of Brahms' Symphony No. 1 (in C minor), the second subject group begins in the relative E♭ major and goes to the parallel mediant E♭ minor. It also occurs in the first movement of Beethoven's Piano Sonata No. 8 (also in C minor), except the second subject group starts in E♭ minor before going to E♭ major. The opening movement of Dvorak's Symphony No. 9 in E minor has its second subject group start in the minor mediant G minor and then to its parallel G major. And in the opening movement of his Symphony No. 6 in D major, the first theme of the second subject group is in the relative B minor while the second theme is in the parallel submediant B major.

=== Modulations within the first subject group ===
The first subject group need not be entirely in the tonic key. In the more complex sonata expositions there can be brief modulations to fairly remote keys, followed by reassertion of the tonic. For example, Mozart's String Quintet in C, K. 515, visits C minor and D♭ major as chromaticism within the C major first subject group, before finally moving to D major, the dominant of the dominant major (G major), preparing the second subject group in the dominant. Many works by Schubert and later composers utilized even further harmonic convolutions. In the first subject group of Schubert's Piano Sonata in B♭, D. 960, for example, the theme is presented three times, in B♭ major, in G♭ major, and then again in B♭ major. The second subject group is even more wide-ranging. It begins in F♯ minor, moves into A major, then through B♭ major to F major.

=== Recapitulations in the "wrong key" ===
In the recapitulation section, the key of the first subject group may be in a key other than tonic, most often in the subdominant, known as a "subdominant recapitulation". In some pieces by Mozart, such as Mozart's Piano Sonata No. 16 in C, K. 545, or the finale of his String Quartet No. 14 in G, K. 387, the first subject group will be in the subdominant and then modulate back to tonic for the second subject group and coda. This case is also found in the first movement of Beethoven's "Kreutzer" sonata. Schubert was also a prominent user of the subdominant recapitulation; it appears for example in the opening movements of his Symphonies No. 2 and No. 5, as well as those of his piano sonatas D 279, D 459, D 537, D 575, as well as the finale of D 664. Sometimes this effect is also used for false reprises in the "wrong key" that are soon followed by the actual recapitulation in the tonic, such as in the first movement of Haydn's quartet Op. 76 No. 1 in G (false reprise in the subdominant), or the finale of Schubert's piano sonata in A, D 959 (false reprise in the major submediant). A special case is the recapitulation that begins in the tonic minor, for example in the slow movement of Haydn's quartet Op. 76 No. 4 in E♭, or the opening movement of Haydn's Symphony No. 47 in G major. In the Classical period, the subdominant is the only possible substitute for the tonic at this position (because any other key would need resolution and would have to be introduced as a false reprise in the development), but with the erosion of the distinction between the sharp and flat directions and the blurring of tonal areas true recapitulations beginning in other keys became possible after around 1825.

It is possible for the first subject group to begin in tonic (or a key other than tonic), modulate to another key and then back to tonic for the second subject group. In the finale of the original 1872 version of Tchaikovsky's Symphony No. 2, the first subject group begins in the tonic C major, modulates to E♭ major, then through E major, and then modulates back to tonic for the second subject group and coda. And in the last movement of Schubert's Symphony No. 9 in C major, the first subject group is in the flattened mediant E♭ major, modulates to the subdominant F major and then back to tonic for the second subject group and coda. It is also possible to have the second subject group in a key other than tonic while the first subject group is in the home key. For instance in the first movement of Richard Strauss's Symphony No. 2 in F minor, the recapitulation begins with the first subject group in tonic but modulates to the mediant A♭ major for the second subject group before modulating back to F minor for the coda. Another example is the first movement of Dvorak's Symphony No. 9. The recapitulation begins in the tonic E minor for the first subject group, but the second subject group modulates to G♯ minor, then through A♭ major before modulating back to the tonic key for the coda. Similarly, in Beethoven's "Waldstein" Sonata, the first subject group is in the tonic C major, then modulates to A major for the first part of the second subject group but quickly goes through A minor to modulate back to tonic for the rest of the second subject group and coda.

Another possibility is both subject groups in the recapitulation going through multiple keys. In the first movement of Schubert's Symphony No. 8, the first subject group begins in the tonic B minor but modulates to E minor and then to F♯ minor. The second subject group starts in the mediant D major before modulating to the parallel tonic B major.

Romantic works even exhibit progressive tonality in sonata form: for example, the second movement 'Quasi-Faust' from Charles-Valentin Alkan's Grande sonate 'Les quatre âges' is in D♯ minor, and while the exposition travels from D♯ to the major subdominant G♯ major, the recapitulation begins again in D♯ minor and ends in the relative major F♯ major, and stays there till the end of the movement. Such a scheme may have been constructed to conform with the programmatic nature of the movement, but also fits well with the Romantic penchant for beginning a work at maximum tension and decreasing the tension afterwards, so that the point of ultimate stability is not reached until the last possible moment. (Furthermore, the identification of a minor key with its relative major is common in the Romantic period, supplanting the earlier Classical identification of a minor key with its parallel major.)

=== Partial or varied recapitulations ===
In some pieces in sonata form, in the recapitulation, the first subject group is omitted, leaving only the second subject group, like the second movement of Haydn's Sonata Hob. XVI/35, as well as the opening movements of Chopin's Piano Sonata No. 2 and No. 3 and the finale of Tchaikovsky's Symphony No. 2 (1880 revised version). It is also possible for the first subject group to be slightly different in comparison of the exposition, like the fourth movement of Dvorak's Symphony No. 9. Another example occurs in the finale of Mozart's string quartet K. 387, where the opening of the first subject group is cut, and in the quintet K. 515, where a later portion of the first subject group is cut. On the other hand, it is also possible for the subject groups to be reversed in order, like the fourth movement of Bruckner's Symphony No. 7, or the first movement of Mozart's piano sonata in D major, K. 311. The second subject group's melody can be different compared to the exposition, like Haydn's Symphony No. 44. Such melodic adjustment is common in minor-key sonata forms, when the mode of the second subject needs to be changed, for example in the opening movement of Mozart's wind serenade K. 388. In rare cases, the second subject theme can be omitted, as in the finales of Tchaikovsky's Symphony. No 1 and his Violin Concerto in D major; in the case of the first symphony, the movement's introductory theme replaces the second subject group.

=== Overlapping development and recapitulation ===
Sometimes, the development and recapitulation sections can overlap one another. In the finale of Brahms's Symphony No. 1, the first subject group is restated immediately after the exposition, getting further developed briefly; new thematic material and a restatement of the movement's introductory theme follow, and then the second subject group is recapitulated afterwards. Another example is the opening movement of Dvorak's Symphony No. 4. The recapitulation begins midway into the development section with an abridged restatement of the first subject group, which then gets developed further, and the second subject group follows.

=== Truncated sonata form ===
Occasionally, especially in some Romantic works, the sonata form extends only as far as the end of the exposition, at which point the piece transitions directly into the next movement instead of a development section. One example is Henryk Wieniawski's Violin Concerto No. 2 in D minor. Another example is Fritz Seitz's Violin Concertos for students, where such a truncated sonata form is used ostensibly to cut down on the first movements' length. Sometimes, the third movement of such works is the recapitulation of the first movement (one example being Franz Strauss' Horn Concerto in C Minor), making the entire work effectively a single-movement sonata.

Some Classical slow movements involve a different sort of truncation, in which the development section is replaced altogether by a short retransition. This occurs in the slow movements of Mozart's quartets K. 387, K. 458, K. 465, K. 575, and K. 589. It is also common in overtures, occurring for example in Mozart's overture to Le nozze di Figaro, or Rossini's overture to Il barbiere di Siviglia. This is distinct from a short development, such as in the opening movement of Mozart's Violin Sonata in G major, K. 379.

Another instance of a truncated sonata form has the development section completely omitted altogether, and the recapitulation immediately follows the exposition (even without a retransitional passage). This is known as sonatina form. And it occurs in the second movement of Beethoven's Symphony No. 8. It also happens in the first movement of Tchaikovsky's Serenade for Strings and again in the third movement of his Symphony No. 6.

== In concerti ==
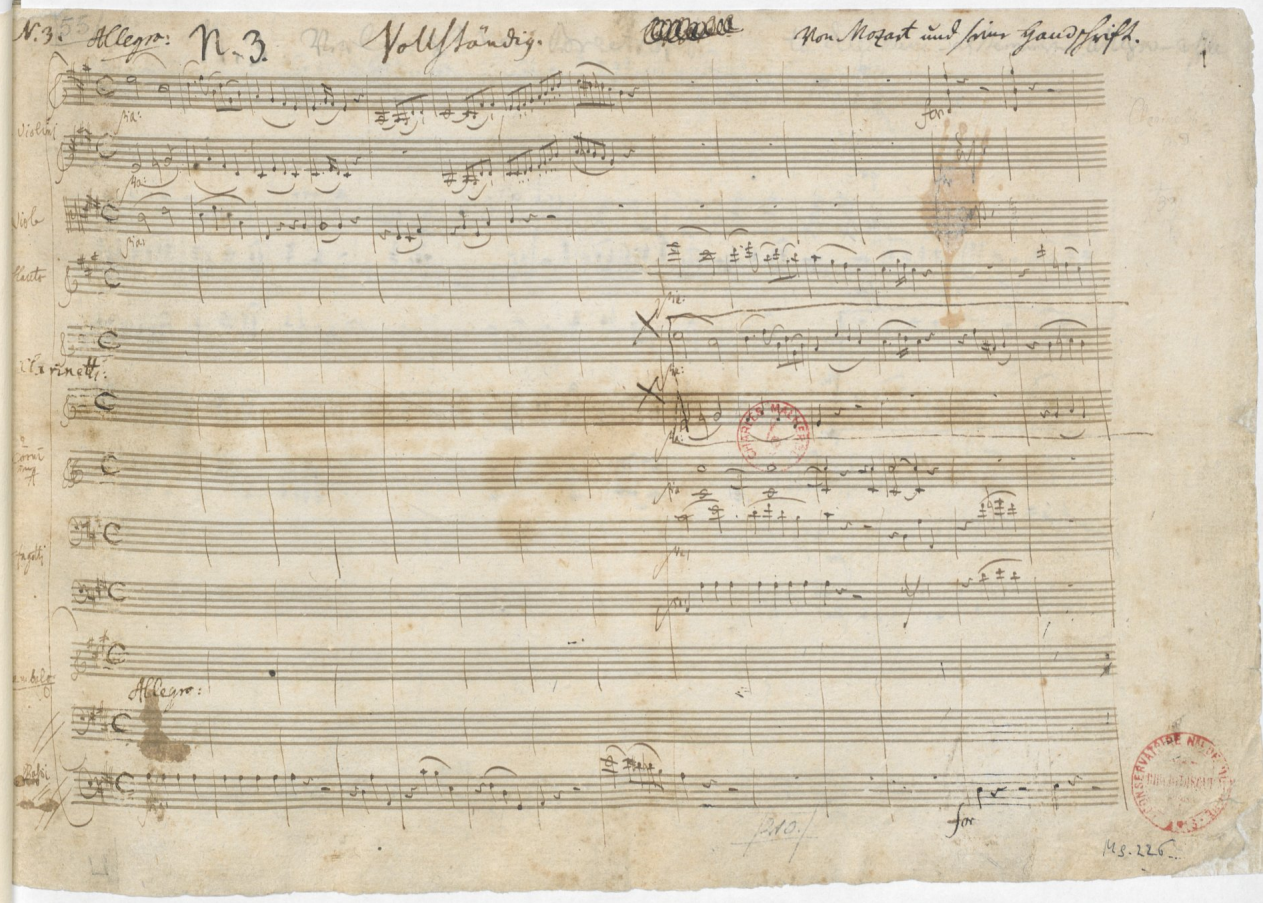
First page of the autograph manuscript of Mozart's Piano Concerto No. 23

An important variant on traditional sonata-allegro form is found in the first movement of the Classical concerto. Here, the sonata-allegro's customary 'repeated exposition' is replaced by two different but related sections: the 'tutti exposition' and the 'solo exposition'. Prototypically the 'tutti exposition' does not feature the soloist (except, in early classical works, in a 'continuo' role), and does not contain the decisive sonata-exposition modulation to the secondary key. Only when the 'solo exposition' is under way does the solo instrument assert itself and participate in the move to (classically) the dominant or relative major. The situation is only seemingly different in the case of Mozart's concerto No. 9, where the soloist is heard at the outset: as the later unfolding of those movements makes clear, the opening piano solo or early piano flourishes actually precede the start of the exposition proper. This presentation is also found in Classical-to-Romantic transition, such as Beethoven's piano concertos No. 4 or No. 5, and Romantic concertos, like Grieg's A minor concerto or Brahms' B♭ major concerto.

A structural feature that the special textural situation of the concerto makes possible is the 'ownership' of certain themes or materials by the solo instrument; such materials will thus not be exposed until the 'solo' exposition. Mozart was fond of deploying his themes in this way.

Towards the end of the recapitulation of a concerto movement in sonata form, there is usually a cadenza for the soloist alone. This has an improvisatory character (it may or may not actually be improvised), and, in general, serves to prolong the harmonic tension on a dominant-quality chord before the orchestra ends the piece in the tonic.

Some may decline the existence of "double exposition" - they would say the first subject theme actually extends far out from the start of the "tutti exposition" to the first subject of the "solo exposition", meaning there is only one exposition.

== History ==
The term sonata is first found in the 17th century, when instrumental music had just begun to become increasingly separated from vocal music. The original meaning of the term (derived from the Italian word suonare, to sound on instrument) referred to a piece for playing, distinguished from cantata, a piece for singing. At this time, the term implies a binary form, usually AABB with some aspects of three part forms. Early examples of simple pre-Classical sonata forms include Pergolesi's Trio Sonata No. 3 in G major.

The Classical era established the norms of structuring first movements and the standard layouts of multi-movement works. There was a period of a wide variety of layouts and formal structures within first movements that gradually became expected norms of composition. The practice of Haydn and Mozart, as well as other notable composers, became increasingly influential on a generation that sought to exploit the possibilities offered by the forms that Haydn and Mozart had established in their works. In time, theory on the layout of the first movement became more and more focused on understanding the practice of Haydn, Mozart and, later, Beethoven and Schubert. Their works were studied, patterns and exceptions to those patterns identified, and the boundaries of acceptable or usual practice set by the understanding of their works. The sonata form as it is described is strongly identified with the norms of the Classical period in music. Even before it had been described, the form had become central to music making, absorbing or altering other formal schemas for works. Examples include Beethoven's Appassionata sonata.

The Romantic era in music was to accept the centrality of this practice, codify the form explicitly and make instrumental music in this form central to concert and chamber composition and practice, in particular for works that were meant to be regarded as "serious" works of music. Various controversies in the 19th century would center on exactly what the implications of "development" and sonata practice actually meant, and what the role of the Classical masters was in music. It is ironic that, at the same time that the form was being codified (by the likes of Czerny and so forth), composers of the day were writing works that flagrantly violated some of the principles of the codified form.

It has continued to be influential through the subsequent history of classical music through to the modern period. The 20th century brought a wealth of scholarship that sought to found the theory of the sonata form on basic tonal laws. The 20th century would see a continued expansion of acceptable practice, leading to the formulation of ideas by which there existed a "sonata principle" or "sonata idea" that unified works of the type, even if they did not explicitly meet the demands of the normative description.

== Sonata form and other musical forms ==
Sonata form shares characteristics with both binary form and ternary form. In terms of key relationships, it is very like binary form, with a first half moving from the home key to the dominant and the second half moving back again (this is why sonata form is sometimes known as compound binary form); in other ways it is very like ternary form, being divided into three sections, the first (exposition) of a particular character, the second (development) in contrast to it, the third section (recapitulation) the same as the first.

The early binary sonatas by Domenico Scarlatti provide excellent examples of the transition from binary to sonata-allegro form. Among the many sonatas are numerous examples of the true sonata form being crafted into place.

== Sonata theory ==
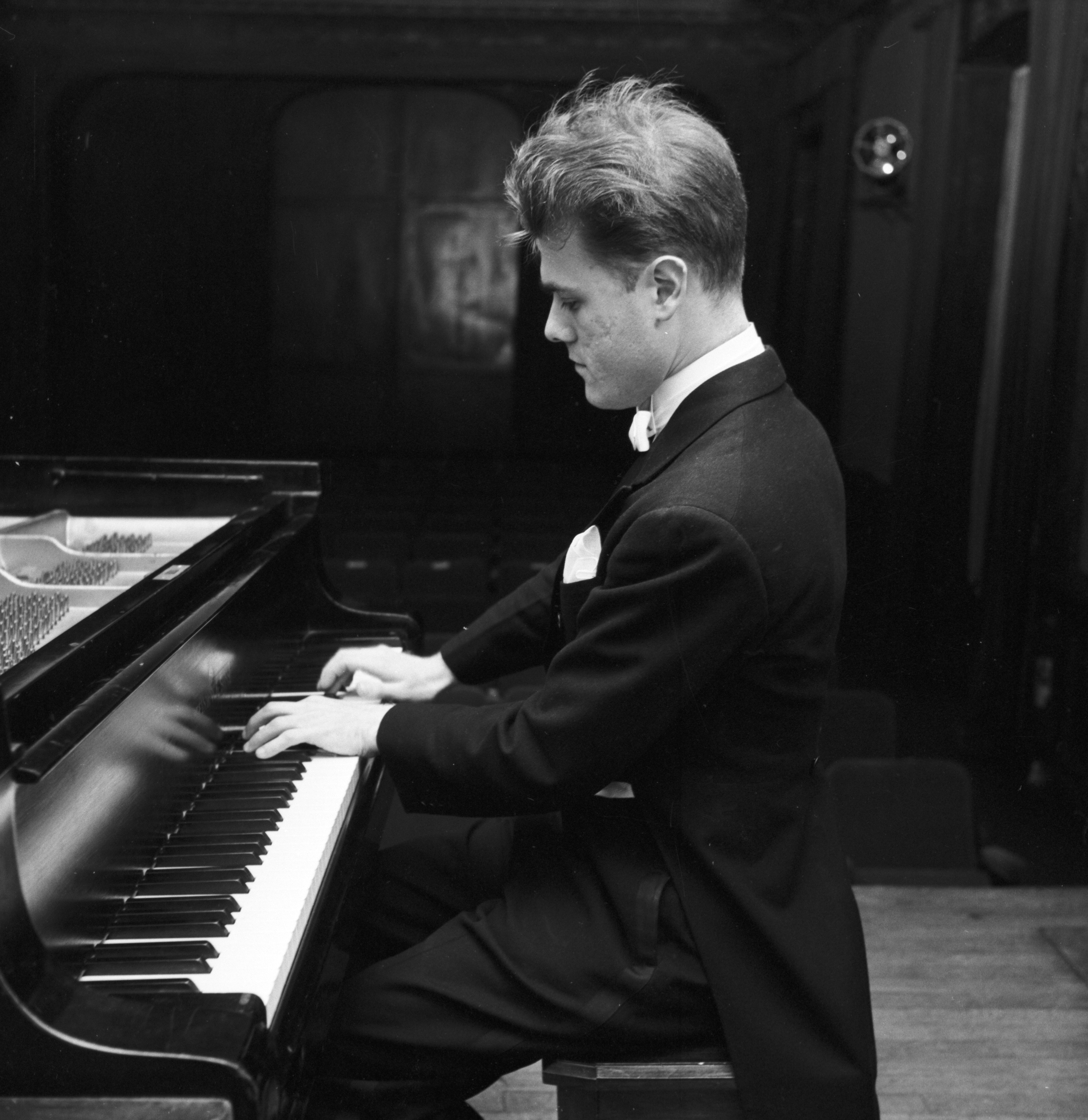
Writer and pianist Charles Rosen wrote Sonata Forms in 1980

The sonata form is a guide to composers as to the schematic for their works, for interpreters to understand the grammar and meaning of a work, and for listeners to understand the significance of musical events. A host of musical details are determined by the harmonic meaning of a particular note, chord or phrase. The sonata form, because it describes the shape and hierarchy of a movement, tells performers what to emphasize, and how to shape phrases of music. Its theory begins with the description, in the 18th century, of schematics for works, and was codified in the early 19th century. This codified form is still used in the pedagogy of the sonata form.

In the 20th century, emphasis moved from the study of themes and keys to how harmony changed through the course of a work and the importance of cadences and transitions in establishing a sense of "closeness" and "distance" in a sonata. The work of Heinrich Schenker and his ideas about "foreground", "middleground", and "background" became enormously influential in the teaching of composition and interpretation. Schenker believed that inevitability was the key hallmark of a successful composer, and that, therefore, works in sonata form should demonstrate an inevitable logic.

In the simplest example, playing of a cadence should be in relationship to the importance of that cadence in the overall form of the work. More important cadences are emphasized by pauses, dynamics, sustaining and so on. False or deceptive cadences are given some of the characteristics of a real cadence, and then this impression is undercut by going forward more quickly. For this reason, changes in performance practice bring changes to the understanding of the relative importance of various aspects of the sonata form. In the Classical era, the importance of sections and cadences and underlying harmonic progressions gives way to an emphasis on themes. The clarity of strongly differentiated major and minor sections gives way to a more equivocal sense of key and mode. These changes produce changes in performance practice: when sections are clear, then there is less need to emphasize the points of articulation. When they are less clear, greater importance is placed on varying the tempo during the course of the music to give "shape" to the music.

Over the last half-century, a critical tradition of examining scores, autographs, annotations, and the historical record has changed, sometimes subtly, on occasion dramatically, the way the sonata form is viewed. It has led to changes in how works are edited; for example, the phrasing of Beethoven's piano works has undergone a shift to longer and longer phrases that are not always in step with the cadences and other formal markers of the sections of the underlying form. Comparing the recordings of Schnabel, from the beginning of modern recording, with those of Barenboim and then Pratt shows a distinct shift in how the structure of the sonata form is presented to the listener over time.

For composers, the sonata form is like the plot of a play or movie script, describing when the crucial plot points are, and the kinds of material that should be used to connect them into a coherent and orderly whole. At different times the sonata form has been taken to be quite rigid, and at other times a freer interpretation has been considered permissible.

In the theory of sonata form it is often asserted that other movements stand in relation to the sonata-allegro form, either, per Charles Rosen that they are really "sonata forms", plural—or as Edward T. Cone asserts, that the sonata-allegro is the ideal to which other movement structures "aspire". This is particularly seen to be the case with other movement forms that commonly occur in works thought of as sonatas. As a sign of this the word "sonata" is sometimes prepended to the name of the form, in particular in the case of the sonata rondo form. Slow movements, in particular, are seen as being similar to sonata-allegro form, with differences in phrasing and less emphasis on the development.

However, Schoenberg and other theorists who used his ideas as a point of departure see the theme and variations as having an underlying role in the construction of formal music, calling the process continuing variation, and argue from this idea that the sonata-allegro form is a means of structuring the continuing variation process. Theorists of this school include Erwin Ratz and William E. Caplin.

Subsections of works are sometimes analyzed as being in sonata form, in particular single movement works, such as the Konzertstück in F minor of Carl Maria von Weber.

From the 1950s onward, Hans Keller developed a 'two-dimensional' method of analysis that explicitly considered form and structure from the point of view of listener expectations. In his work, the sonata-allegro was a well-implied 'background form' against whose various detailed features composers could compose their individual 'foregrounds'; the 'meaningful contradiction' of expected background by unexpected foreground was seen as generating the expressive content. In Keller's writings, this model is applied in detail to Schoenberg's 12-note works as well as the classical tonal repertoire. In recent times, two other musicologists, James Hepokoski and Warren Darcy, have presented, without reference to Keller, their analysis, which they term Sonata Theory, of the sonata-allegro form and the sonata cycle in terms of genre expectations, and categorized both the sonata-allegro movement and the sonata cycle by the compositional choices made to respect or depart from conventions. Their study focuses on the normative period of sonata practice, notable ones being the works of Haydn, Mozart, Beethoven, Schubert, and their close contemporaries, projecting this practice forward to development of the sonata-allegro form into the 19th and 20th centuries.
