= James Hepokoski =

American musicologist (born 1946)

James Arnold Hepokoski (born 20 December 1946) is an American musicologist. He is best known for his work with Warren Darcy on developing sonata theory, first fully explained in their 2006 book Elements of Sonata Theory.

== Life and career ==
James Arnold Hepokoski was born on 20 December 1946 in Duluth, Minnesota. He earned his master's degree and PhD in Music History from Harvard University, studying with David G. Hughes, John M. Ward, Oliver Strunk and Christoph Wolff, earning his doctorate in 1979 with a dissertation on Giuseppe Verdi's Falstaff. He was Professor of Music at Yale University from 1999 until his retirement in 2019; earlier he taught at the University of Minnesota and at Oberlin College. In July 2017 he became the Henry L. and Lucy G. Moses Professor of Music at Yale. His daughter is lawyer, Laura Nirider.

He is best known for his writing on sonata form and its relation to the works of Ludwig van Beethoven and Jean Sibelius, as well as examinations of the symphony tradition and Verdi's late operas. Beginning in 1990, he and theorist Warren Darcy developed a new approach to sonata analysis known as Sonata Theory, culminating in the book Elements of Sonata Theory which makes a large-scale argument about the relation of genre to musical structure and choices, and which was the recipient of the Society for Music Theory's 2008 Wallace Berry Award. In 2020 he published a concise Sonata Theory Handbook.

== Selected publications ==
- Hepokoski, James; Darcy, Warren (2006). Elements of Sonata Theory: Norms, Types, and Deformations in the Late-Eighteenth-Century Sonata. Oxford: Oxford University Press. doi:10.1093/acprof:oso/9780195146400.001.0001. ISBN 978-0-19-514640-0.
- —— (2020). A Sonata Theory Handbook. Oxford: Oxford University Press. ISBN 978-0-19-753681-0.
