= Erika Giovanna Klien =

American painter (1900–1957)

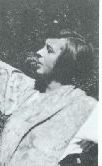
- Born: 12 April 1900; Borgo Valsugana, Austria-Hungary
- Died: 19 July 1957 (aged 57); New York, New York
- Known for: Painting
- Movement: Kinetism

Erika Giovanna Klien (12 April 1900 – 19 July 1957) was an artist and art educator.

== Career ==
Erika Giovanna Klien was born on 12 April 1900, in Borgo Valsugana, Austria-Hungary. She began her studies at the Vienna School of Applied Arts, also known as Kunstgewerbeschule Wien in Vienna, Austria in 1919 and graduated in 1925. A student of Dr. Franz Cižek, Klien became one of his teaching assistants. In Cižek's course, "Theory of Ornamental Form", Klien was introduced to a new style known as Viennese Kineticism – a style that emphasized movement and modern vitality, in a way similar to French Cubism, Italian Futurism and Russian Constructivism. After learning about the technique and theories of Kinetism, Klien became one of its leading exponents. After graduation, Klien found it difficult, as did many women, to earn a living as an independent artist. She worked as a commercial graphic artist and taught at the Elizabeth Duncan School, at Klessheim near Salzburg, from 1926 to 1928.

Klien's work was included in several international exhibitions, such as the Paris Decorative Arts Exhibition of 1925, the Armory Show in New York City in 1927 and the Fourth International Congress of Art Education in Prague in 1928.

In 1928 Klien had a son, whom she kept secret from her family. In 1929 Klien sailed for the United States, bringing with her hopes for an artistic career and the reform theories of children's art education she had acquired in Vienna. To earn a living for herself and her son, she taught simultaneously at four institutions from 1930 to 1940 – the New York's Stuyvesant High School, Spence School, Dalton School and the Walt Whitman High School (New York).

Klien became a U. S. citizen in 1938. She died on 19 July 1957 from a heart attack in New York City.

Klien's son Walter Klien became a noted concert pianist. He died in 1991.

== Exhibitions ==
- 1930: The New School for Social Research, New York
- 1975: Galerie Pabst, Vienna
- 1986: Retrospective at Gallery Pabst, Munich
- 1987: Museum des XX. Jahrhunderts (Museum of the 20th Century), Vienna (250 works)
- 1989: Rachel Adler Gallery, New York
- 2001: Bolzano
- 2006: Société Anonyme at the Hammer, reviewed in The Aesthetic
- 2026: Belvedere Gallery, Vienna - ‘All is Movement’
- Permanently: Phillips Collection Art Museum in Washington, D.C.
