= Binary form =

Musical structure with two contrasting sections

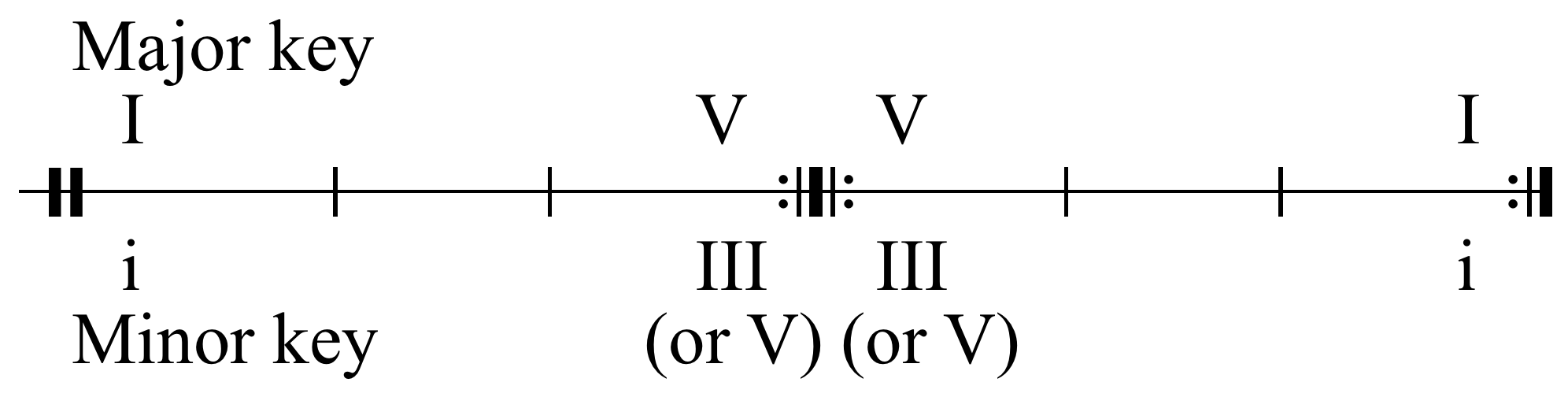
Binary form in major and minor keys. Each section must be at least two phrases long.

Binary form is a musical form in 2 related sections, both of which are usually repeated. Binary is also a structure used to choreograph dance. In music this is usually performed as A-A-B-B.

Binary form was popular during the Baroque period, often used to structure movements of keyboard sonatas. It was also used for short, one-movement works. Around the middle of the 18th century, the form largely fell from use as the principal design of entire movements as sonata form and organic development gained prominence. When it is found in later works, it usually takes the form of the theme in a set of variations, or the Minuet, Scherzo, or Trio sections of a "minuet and trio" or "scherzo and trio" movement in a sonata, symphony, etc. Many larger forms incorporate binary structures, and many more complicated forms (such as the 18th-century sonata form) share certain characteristics with binary form.

== Structure ==
A typical example of a piece in binary form has two large sections of roughly equal duration. The first will begin in a certain key, which will often, (but not always), modulate to a closely related key. Pieces in a major key will usually modulate to the dominant, (the fifth scale degree above the tonic). Pieces in a minor key will generally modulate to the relative major key, (the key of the third scale degree above the minor tonic), or to the dominant minor. A piece in minor may also stay in the original key at the end of the first section, closing with an imperfect cadence.

The second section of the piece begins in the newly established key, where it remains for an indefinite period of time. After some harmonic activity, the piece will eventually modulate back to its original key before ending.

More often than not, especially in 18th-century compositions, the A and B sections are separated by double bars with repeat signs, meaning both sections were to be repeated.

Binary form is usually characterized as having the form AB, though since both sections repeat, a more accurate description would be AABB. Others, however, prefer to use the label AA′. This second designation points to the fact that there is no great change in character between the two sections. The rhythms and melodic material used will generally be closely related in each section, and if the piece is written for a musical ensemble, the instrumentation will generally be the same. This is in contrast to the use of verse-chorus form in popular music—the contrast between the two sections is primarily one of the keys used.

== Further distinctions ==
A piece in binary form can be further classified according to a number of characteristics:

=== Simple vs. rounded ===
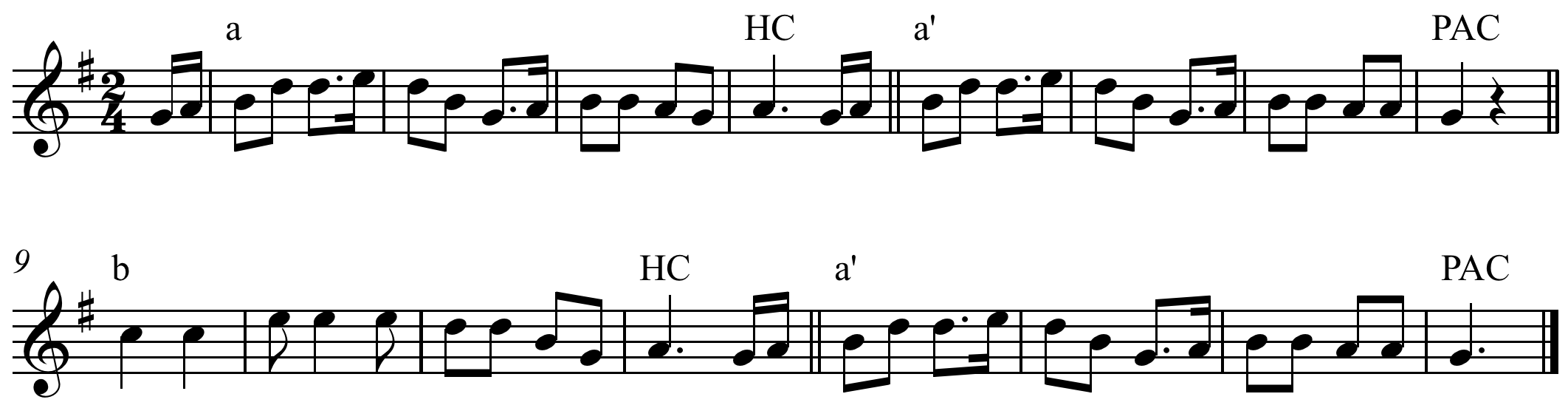
"Oh, Susannah": rounded binary form.

Occasionally, the B section will end with a reprise of the A section. This is referred to as rounded binary, and is labeled ABA′. In rounded binary, the beginning of the B section is sometimes referred to as the "bridge", and will usually conclude with a half cadence in the original key. Rounded binary is not to be confused with ternary form, also labeled ABA—the difference being that, in ternary form, the B section contrasts completely with the A material as in, for example, a minuet and trio. Another important difference between the rounded and ternary form is that in rounded binary, when the "A" section returns, it will typically contain only half of the full "A" section, whereas ternary form will end with the full "A" section.

Sometimes, as in the keyboard sonatas of Domenico Scarlatti, the return of the A theme may include much of the original A section in the tonic key, so much so that some of his sonatas can be regarded as precursors of sonata form.

Rounded binary form is sometimes referred to as small ternary form.

Rounded binary or minuet form:

A      :||: B                           A or A'
I(->V) :||: V(or other closely related) I

If the B section lacks such a return of the opening A material, the piece is said to be in simple binary.

Simple:

A->B :||: A->B
I->V :||: V->I

Slow-movement form:

A'        A"
I->V      I->I

Many examples of rounded binary are found among the church sonatas of Vivaldi including his Sonata No. 1 for Cello and Continuo, First Movement, while certain Baroque composers such as Bach and Handel used the form rarely.

=== Sectional vs. continuous ===
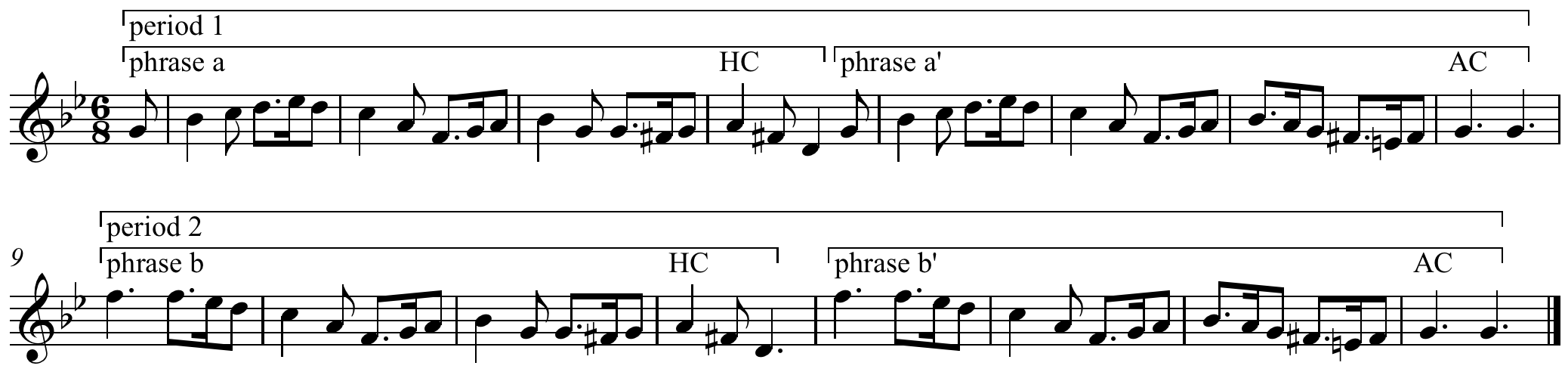
"Greensleeves": sectional binary form (first phrase ends with the tonic).Note: the example here is in minor mode rather than the more historically accurate Dorian mode.

If the A section ends with an authentic (or perfect) cadence in the original tonic key of the piece, the design is referred to as a sectional binary. This refers to the fact that the piece is in different tonal sections, each beginning in their own respective keys.

If the A section ends with any other kind of cadence, the design is referred to as a continuous binary. This refers to the fact that the B section will "continue on" with the new key established by the cadence at the end of A.

=== Symmetrical vs. asymmetrical ===
If the A and B sections are roughly equal in length, the design is referred to as symmetrical.

If the A and B sections are of unequal length, the design is referred to as asymmetrical. In such cases, the B section is usually longer than the A section.

The asymmetrical binary form becomes more common than the symmetrical type from about the time of Beethoven, and is almost routine in the main sections of Minuet and Trio or Scherzo and Trio movements in works from this period. In such cases, occasionally only the first section of the binary structure is marked to be repeated.

Although most of Chopin's nocturnes are in an overall ternary form, quite often the individual sections (either the A, the B, or both) are in binary form, most often of the asymmetrical variety. If a section of this binary structure is repeated, in this case it is written out again in full, usually considerably varied, rather than enclosed between repeat signs.

=== Balanced binary ===
Balanced binary consists of ending the first and second sections with analogous cadential material (and arguably pre-cadential material). The usual pattern for balanced binary is continuous (i.e., the first section ends off tonic), with the two sections ending in "rhyming cadences", in which the same cadential material occurs in both sections, appropriately transposed for their keys. This differs from Rounded Binary, since in a Rounded Binary form, thematic material from the A section must return at the end of the B section (which usually occurs at the beginnings of phrases), whereas in a balanced binary, it is sufficient for a meaningful portion of the end of the final phrase to return.

For example, if the A section is a period (using Caplin's naming conventions; elsewhere called a parallel period), the first ("antecedent") phrase of the A section will begin with a basic idea (generally for one half of the phrase) and end with a relatively weak cadence, and the second ("consequent") phrase will begin with the same basic idea and end with a stronger cadence; alternatively, if the A section is a sentence, the first half of the section will consist of two repetitions of the basic idea (with the second possibly transposed or slightly altered), and the rest of the phrase will drive towards a cadence. In a rounded binary form, at the end of the B section, if the A section was a sentence, typically the beginning of the sentence returns, potentially abridged, followed by the cadence; if a period, the same is true, but since the antecedent and the consequent of a period both begin the same way, it is generally simpler to say that the entire consequent phrase returns. However, in either case, it is the basic idea that returns, followed by the cadence. In a balanced binary, the basic idea need not return. There is some room for debate concerning how much material must return preceding the cadence; it is a subjective decision upon which theorists may differ. Thus, it is not always clear how the concept of balanced binary should apply if the A section is a period. However, if the A section is a sentence, the balanced binary may bring back the entire second half of the A section (transposed if appropriate) without ever bringing back the basic idea.

There is also some room for debate concerning how the concept of balanced binary should relate to sectional binary forms. In principle, there is no intrinsic reason why a sectional binary form in which the second half of the A section (whether sentence or period) returns at the end of the B section should not be considered balanced since they end with the same cadences. From this point of view, many rounded binary forms are also balanced (especially those in which the A section is a period), but the fact that they would be balanced would be effectively uninteresting because the fact that they are rounded supersedes this characteristic. However, if one considers rhyming cadences in different keys to be a defining characteristic of balanced binary, then balanced and rounded binaries are mutually exclusive but analogous structures belonging, respectively, to continuous and sectional forms.

=== Rounded vs. incipient or small ternary ===
As noted above, there is some disagreement about the use of the term rounded binary. The disagreements concern two issues: whether the names rounded binary, incipient ternary, or small ternary is more appropriate to describe the form; and how much of the A section must return at the end of the B section to be considered rounded.

The principal difference between rounded binary and small ternary forms is the nature of the B section material between the A section and the return of A section material at the end of the piece. In rounded binary, this additional material is called a digression, and does not stand alone as a conclusive musical section, whereas in ternary, this material constitutes a complete musical section unto itself (albeit not necessarily ending on the tonic chord if an example of continuous ternary form).

The issue concerning how much of the A section must return to be considered rounded binary is subjective. Either the entire A section must return or only the thematic material of the A section (specifically, the basic idea) and the cadence.

Putting these ideas together, if the material between the A section and the return of the thematic material does not stand alone (a digression) and only a part of the A section returns, we do not have a ternary form, and may have a rounded binary, though not all theorist would accept this terminology (and there is some overlap here with the notion of balanced binary -- see above). If we have a digression, but also have the entire A section returning, then it might be called either rounded binary or incipient ternary (meaning, "approaching ternary"), depending on the theorist. If the intermediate material stands on its own as a self-sufficient section, then we have small ternary (in such cases, the entire A section usually returns).
