= Paula Klien =

Brazilian contemporary artist

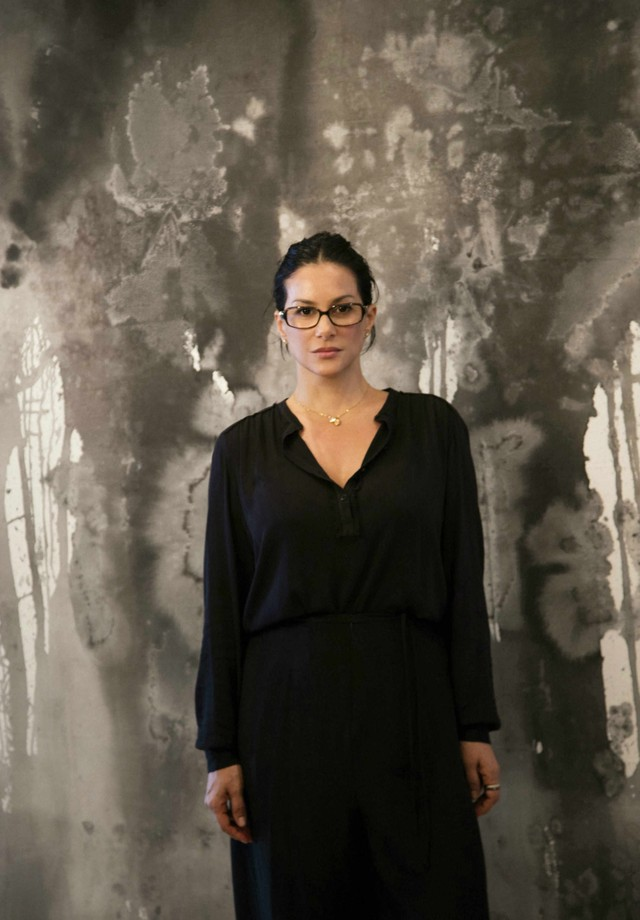
- Paula Klien in Invisibilities
- Born: Paula Klien; Rio de Janeiro
- Known for: Visual art

Paula Klien (born in Rio de Janeiro) is a contemporary Brazilian artist.

== Biography ==
Klien showed work at the Florence Biennale in December 2011 and the Biennale d'arte internazionale di Roma in January 2012.

In 2016, Klien returned to painting, and presented her most recent work in February 2017, in the individual painting ""Invisibilities"", in Berlin.

“Invisibilities" consists of eleven large paintings on canvas and paper, two backlights and a three-dimensional work created with chinese ink on foam.

In March 2017, she participated in the Clio Art Fair in New York City, and in May participated in arteBA in Buenos Aires.

Self taught in drawing, painting and photography, she also studied at the visual arts school of Parque Lage (EAV) in 1982, participated in a lab with Steve McCurry in New York City in 2006 and studied at the Kunst Gut Academy of Fine Arts in Berlin in 2015.
