= Musical argument =

Concept in music theory

A musical argument is a means of creating tension through the relation of expressive content and musical form:

Traditional dialectal (Note: The purpose of the dialectic method of reasoning is resolution of disagreement through rational discussion between opposing viewpoints.) music is representational: the musical form relates to an expressive content and is a means of creating a growing tension; this is what is usually called the musical argument.

— Wim Mertens (1999)

Experimental musical forms may use process or indeterminacy rather than argument.

The musical argument may be characterized as the primary flow and current idea being presented in a piece:

The very definition of musical argument is something that keeps going, and you uncover new details and new combinations. A musical argument is not the same as a verbal argument. A verbal argument implies that there's [sic] two sides; a musical argument makes the two sides one thing, like counterpoint. A fugue is like that; a double fugue, at least, takes two different ideas and shows you how they relate, and it shows you how they're the same thing.

— Phil Lesh (1982)

Thus one may hear of a musical argument being interrupted, extended, or repeated.

== See also ==
- Form and content
- Musical development
- Sonata form
